= Wallace Collection =

Museum in London, England

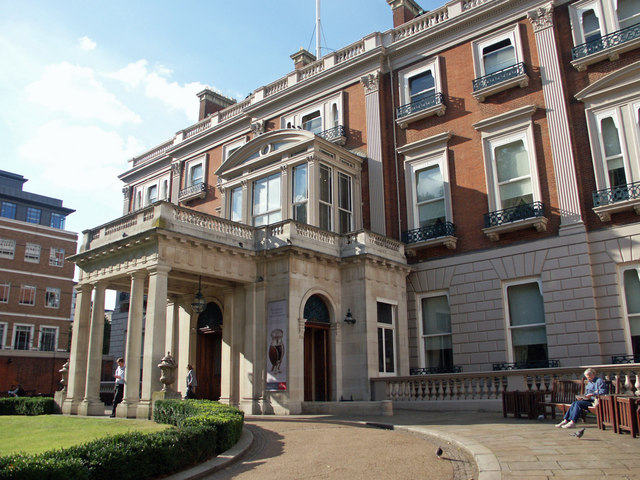
- Front entrance of the main building

- Location within central London
- Established: 1897; 129 years ago
- Location: Manchester Square; London, WC1; United Kingdom
- Coordinates: 51.5175°N 0.1530°W
- Collection size: approx. 5,500 objects displayed in 30 galleries
- Visitors: 419,020 (2016)
- Director: Dr. Xavier Bray
- Public transit access: Bond Street;
- Website: wallacecollection.org

The Wallace Collection is a museum in London occupying Hertford House in Manchester Square, the former townhouse of the Seymour family, Marquesses of Hertford. It is named after Sir Richard Wallace, who built the extensive collection, along with the Marquesses of Hertford, in the 18th and 19th centuries. The collection features fine and decorative arts from the 15th to the 19th centuries with important holdings of French 18th-century paintings, furniture, arms and armour, porcelain and Old Master paintings arranged into 25 galleries. It is open to the public and entry is free.

It was established in 1897 from the private collection mainly created by Richard Seymour-Conway, 4th Marquess of Hertford (1800–1870), who left both it and the house to his illegitimate son Sir Richard Wallace (1818–1890), whose widow Julie Amelie Charlotte Castelnau bequeathed the entire collection to the nation. The collection opened to permanent public view in 1900 in Hertford House, and remains there to this day. A condition of the bequest was that no object should ever leave the collection, even for loan exhibitions. However in September 2019, the board of trustees announced that they had obtained an order from the Charity Commission for England & Wales which allowed them to enter into temporary loan agreements for the first time.

The United Kingdom is particularly rich in the works of the ancien régime, purchased by wealthy families during the revolutionary sales, held in France after the end of the French Revolution. The Wallace Collection, Waddesdon Manor and the Royal Collection, all three located in the United Kingdom, are some of the largest, most important collections of French 18th-century decorative arts in the world, rivalled only by the Musée du Louvre, Château de Versailles and Mobilier National in France. The Wallace Collection is a non-departmental public body and the current director is Xavier Bray.

== History ==
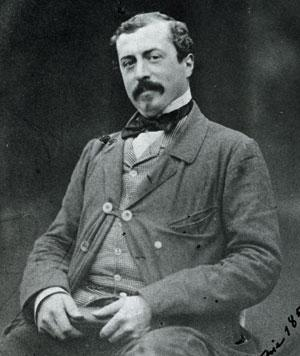
Photograph of Richard Wallace, 1857

The Wallace Collection is a museum which displays works of art collected in the 18th and 19th centuries by five generations of a British aristocratic family – the first four Marquesses of Hertford and Sir Richard Wallace, the illegitimate son of the 4th Marquess. In the 19th century, the Marquesses of Hertford were one of the wealthiest families in Europe. They owned large properties in England, Wales and Ireland, and increased their wealth through successful marriages. Politically of lesser importance, the 3rd and 4th Marquess and Sir Richard Wallace became leading art collectors of their time. Many artworks acquired by the earlier marquesses were entailed and stayed with the Hertford line, along with most of the landholdings; some are still in Ragley Hall.

The Wallace Collection, comprising about 5,500 works of art, was bequeathed to the British nation by Lady Wallace in 1897. The state then decided to buy Hertford House to display the collection and it was opened as a museum in 1900. As a museum the Wallace Collection's main strength is 18th-century French art: paintings, furniture, porcelain, sculpture and gold snuffboxes and 16th- to 19th-century paintings by such as Titian, van Dyck, Rembrandt, Hals, Velázquez, Gainsborough and Delacroix, a collection of arms and armour and medieval and Renaissance objects including Limoges enamels, maiolica, glass and bronzes. Paintings, furniture and porcelain are displayed together in the manner of private collections of the 19th century.

Not all of Wallace's collection was included in the bequest, as the contents of the Château de Bagatelle in Paris were left to Sir John Murray Scott by Lady Wallace and were sold at Christie's in 1913 and by his heir Victoria Sackville-West, Baroness Sackville to Jacques Seligmann & Company in 1914.

== Building ==
=== Hertford House, Cannon Row ===
The 16th- and 17th-century Hertford House was the London townhouse of Edward Seymour, 1st Earl of Hertford (1539–1621) and was in a different location: Cannon Row in Westminster. His father Edward Seymour, 1st Duke of Somerset (executed 1552), brother of Queen Jane Seymour, had started building the palatial Somerset House on the Strand as his townhouse, but did not live to see its completion.

=== Hertford House, Manchester Square ===
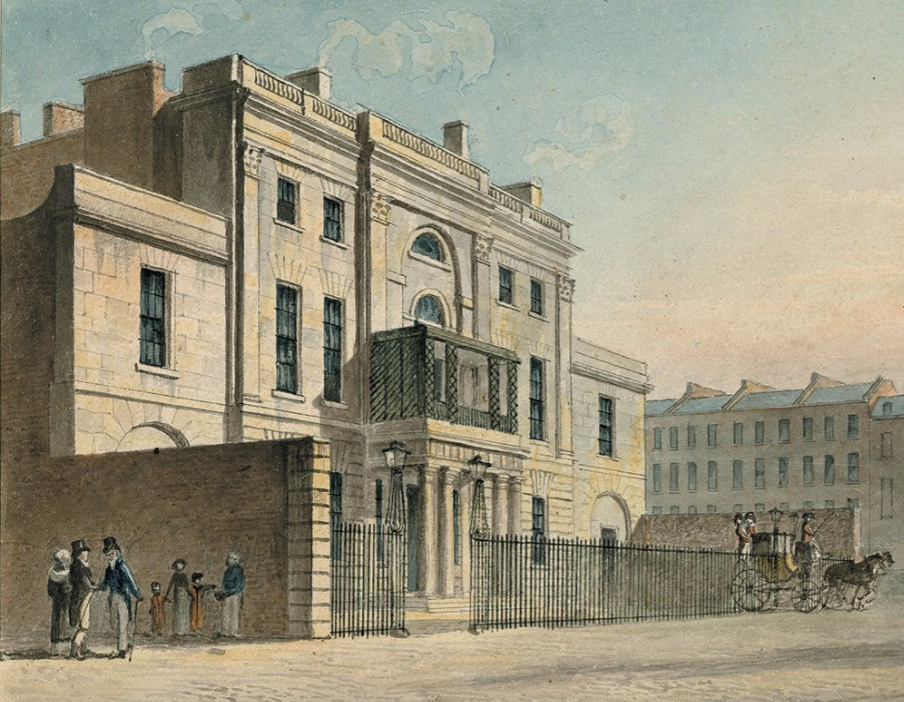
Hertford House, Manchester Square, circa 1812

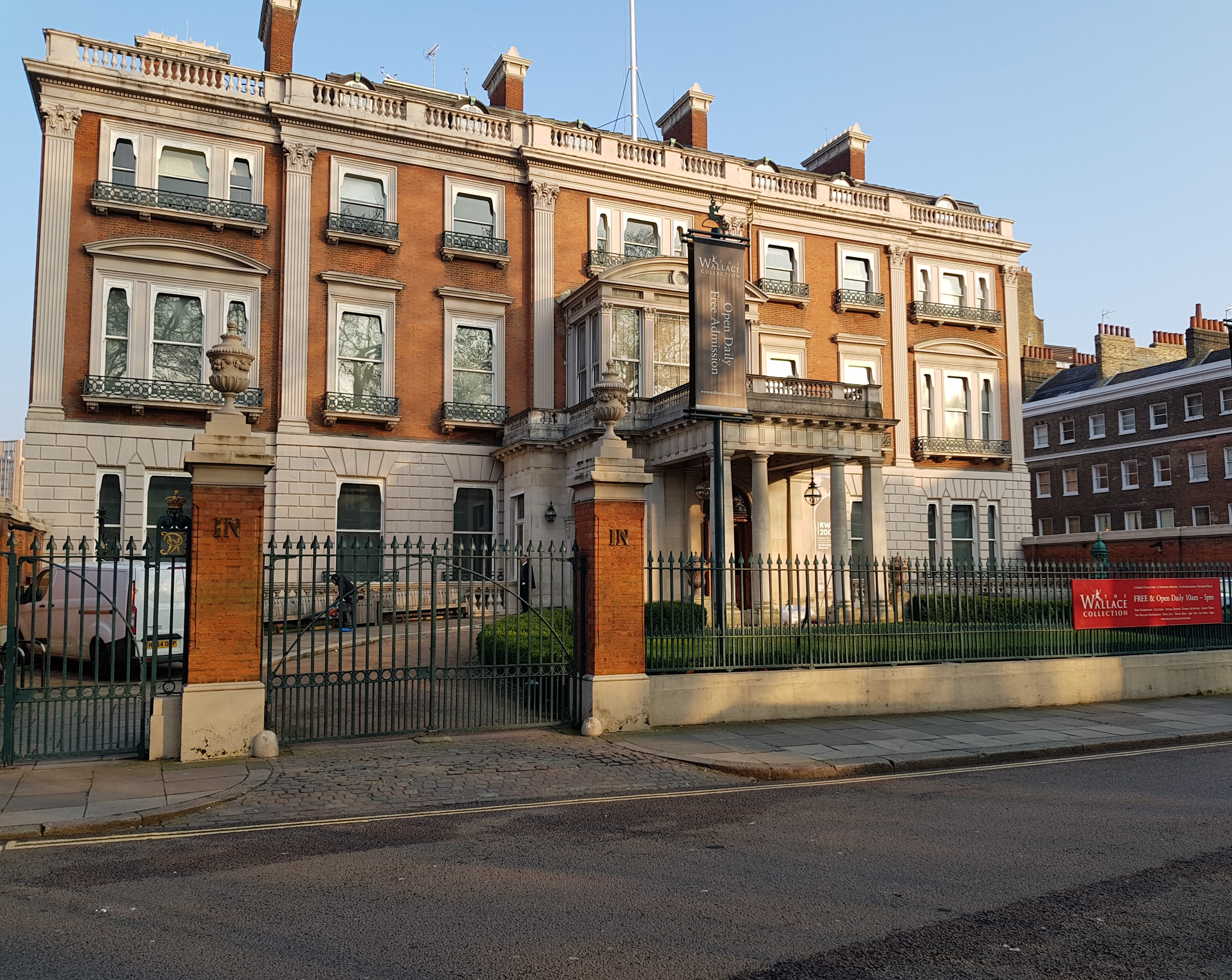
Hertford House, Manchester Square, in 2018, showing the alterations made by Sir Richard Wallace 1872-82

The present House in Manchester Square was the townhouse of a later junior branch of the family. It was built in 1776 by George Montagu, 4th Duke of Manchester who owned and developed the surrounding estate. It dominates the north side of the Square, where it occupies an island site, and was originally named "Manchester House". After being used as the Spanish Embassy 1791–1795 (evidenced by "Spanish Place" the street to the east of the building) the lease was acquired in 1797 by Francis Ingram-Seymour-Conway, 2nd Marquess of Hertford (1743–1822), who in 1814 held there the Allied Sovereigns' Ball after the first defeat of Napoleon in 1814. Francis Seymour-Conway, 3rd Marquess of Hertford (1777–1842), the family's first great art collector, lived mainly at his other London residences, Dorchester House in Mayfair and St Dunstan’s Villa in Regents Park, now the site of the residence of the US Ambassador. Between 1836-51 Hertford House was let for use as the French Embassy. His son Richard Seymour-Conway, 4th Marquess of Hertford (1800–1870), who expanded his father's art collection, lived most of his life in Paris, and rarely visited Hertford House, used "largely as a store for his ever-expanding art collection". He is said never to have visited his principal English country seat of Ragley Hall in Warwickshire. The 4th Marquess died in 1870, aged 70 in Paris, unmarried and without legitimate issue, and his titles and entailed estates, including the lease of Hertford House, passed to his distant cousin Francis Seymour, 5th Marquess of Hertford (1812–1884).

The 4th Marquess's illegitimate son and heir of his unentailed estate, Sir Richard Wallace, 1st Baronet (1818–1890), inherited his art collection, French and Irish estates, and re-purchased Sudbourne Hall in Suffolk and, in 1871, the lease of Hertford House from the 5th Marquess, and returned from Paris with much of the art collection to take up residence in England, following the unstable political climate in France following the Prussian Siege of Paris (1870–1871). Wallace in turn expanded the art collection, adding medieval and Renaissance objects and European arms and armour.

Between 1872–1882 the house was much altered by Sir Richard Wallace, who added a rear extension to house his art collection with a smoking room lined with Minton tiles in Turkish style. Under the architect Thomas Ambler a new front portico was added in the form of a porte-cochère, with large Doric pilasters, storeys were added to both wings and the stables and coach house were converted to galleries by the addition of top-lit roofs. The whole building was given a red brick facade and the windows were altered. Wallace bequeathed all his assets to his wife, who in turn, and most probably according to his wishes, bequeathed the main part of her husband's art collection to the nation, thus forming the "Wallace Collection", the rest, including the French properties and Hertford House, going to the couple's secretary Sir John Murray Scott, 1st Baronet. Scott sold the lease of Hertford House to the UK Government, as a suitable home for the Wallace Collection, after which he was rewarded with a baronetcy, and the Government acquired the freehold from the Portman Estate. Hertford House first opened as a museum on 22 June 1900.

In 2000, the inner courtyard was given a glass roof and a restaurant was opened named "Cafe Bagatelle" after the Château de Bagatelle in Paris purchased in 1835 by Francis Seymour-Conway, 3rd Marquess of Hertford, later part of Scott's inheritance. The museum display does not aim to reconstruct the state of the house when Sir Richard and Lady Wallace lived here.

== Interior ==
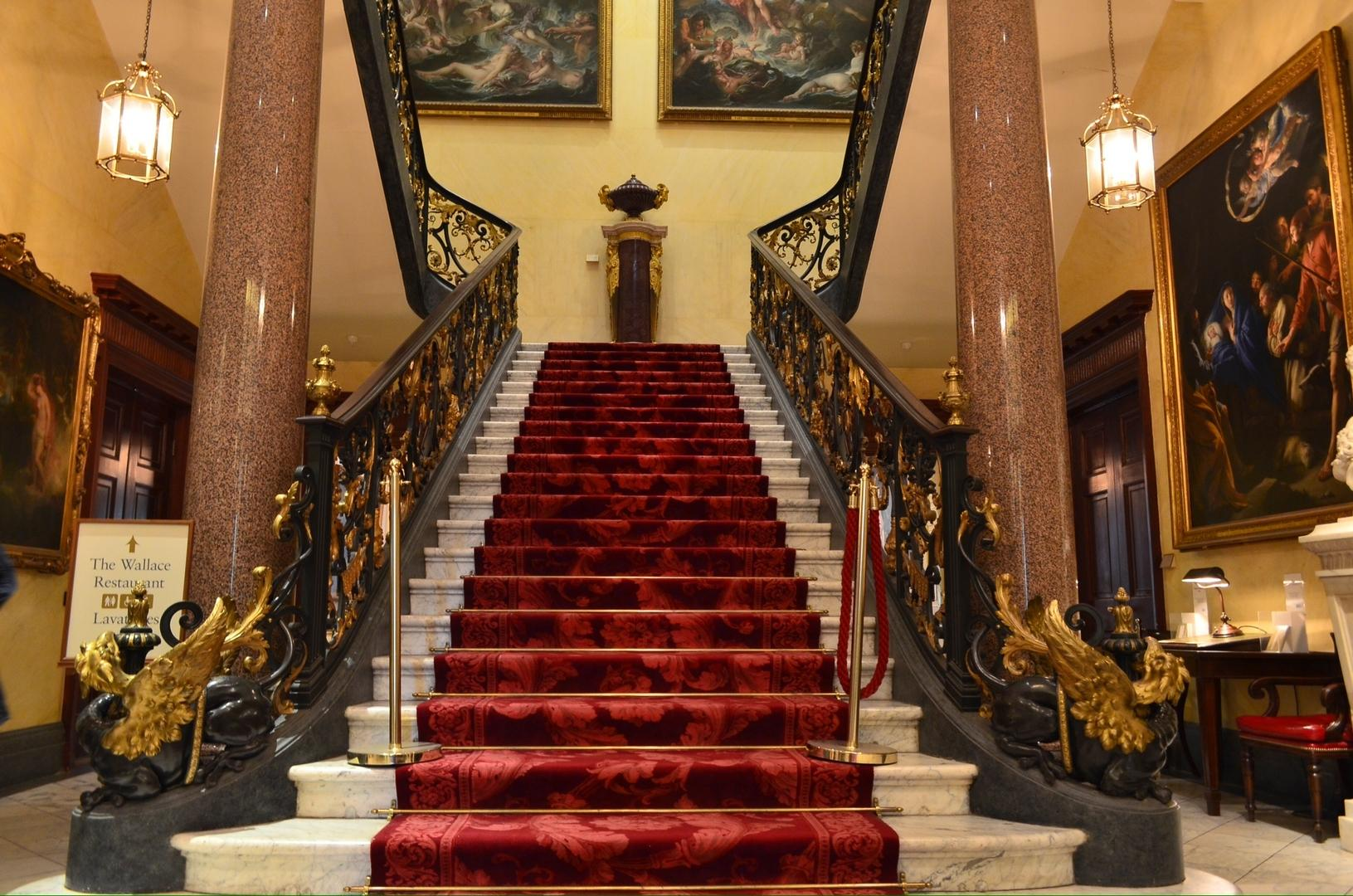
Front Hall

=== Ground Floor ===
==== Hall ====
The Entrance Hall contains marble busts of the three principal founders of the Wallace Collection: Richard Seymour-Conway, 4th Marquess of Hertford (1800–1870), his son, Sir Richard Wallace (1818–1890) and in the lobby, Lady Wallace, who bequeathed the contents of Hertford House to the British nation on her death in 1897. The room has retained the aspect it had in Sir Richard Wallace's day more than any other room in the building.

==== Front State Room ====
Displays: Portraits and Porcelain

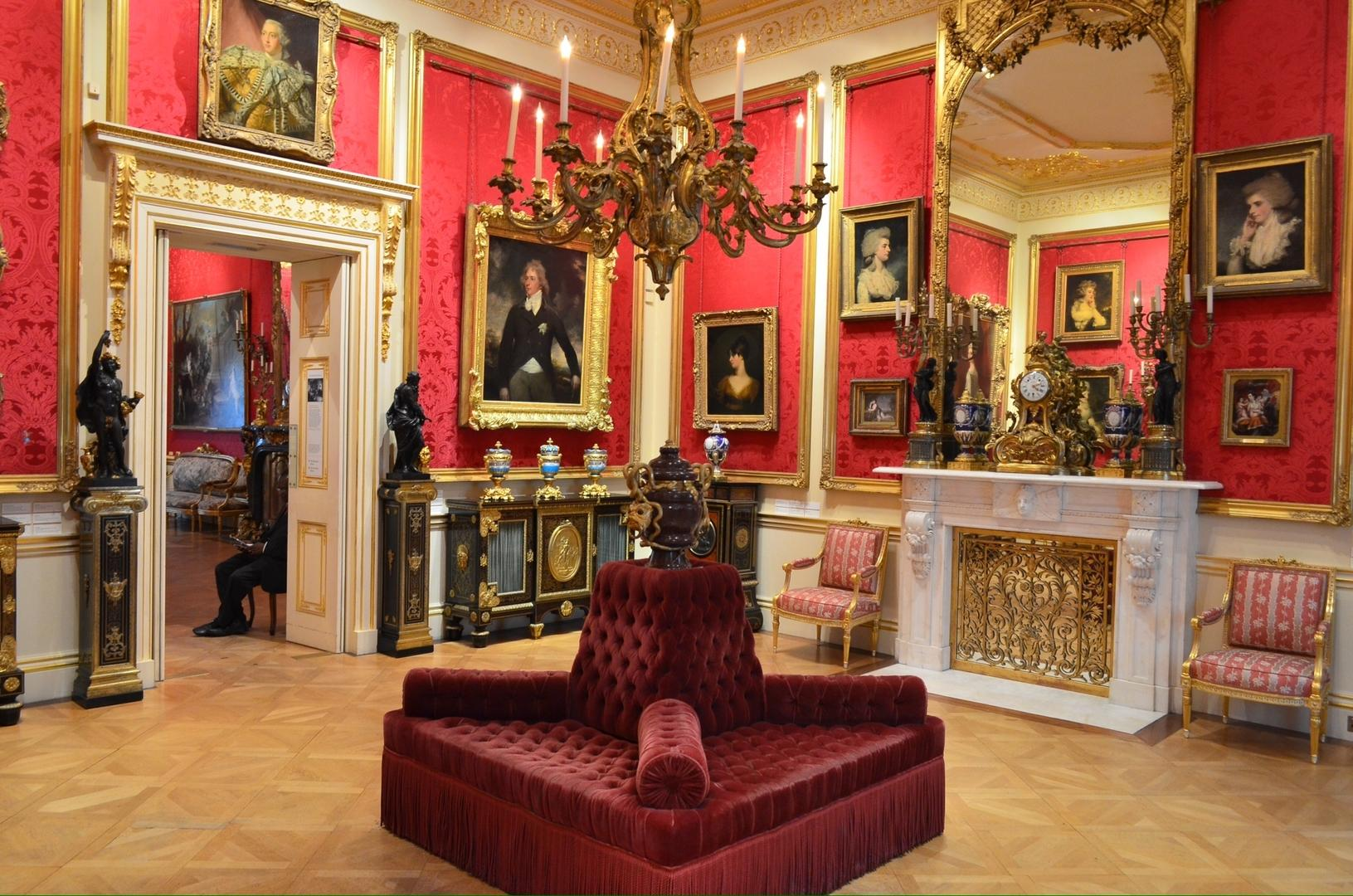
The Front State Room – architecturally restored to its appearance in 1890 with much of the original furnishings returned

This room reveals the opulence of the London town house in the 1870s and sets the scene for visitors to the Wallace Collection. The State Rooms were the grandest rooms in the house, in which the most important visitors were received. When it was the home of Sir Richard and Lady Wallace, visitors to Hertford House first entered the Front State Room, then, as now, hung with portraits. Two items of the modern furniture seen in the room in 1890 were not part of the collection gifted by Lady Wallace and are no longer present, but the mounted porcelain displayed on the cabinets and the chandelier, made by Jean-Jacques Caffiéri in 1571, have been returned to the room.

==== Back State Room ====
Displays: The Rococo at the time of Louis XV and Madame de Pompadour

The Back State Room is today dedicated to the patronage of King Louis XV (1715–1774) and his mistress, Madame de Pompadour. It displays some of the prominent examples in the Wallace Collection of art in the rococo style. Sir Richard Wallace used the Back State Room to entertain guests at Hertford House. During his lifetime it had wooden boiserie panelling on the wall; the great chandelier, by Jacques Caffiéri, dating from 1751, remains in the room.

==== Dining Room ====
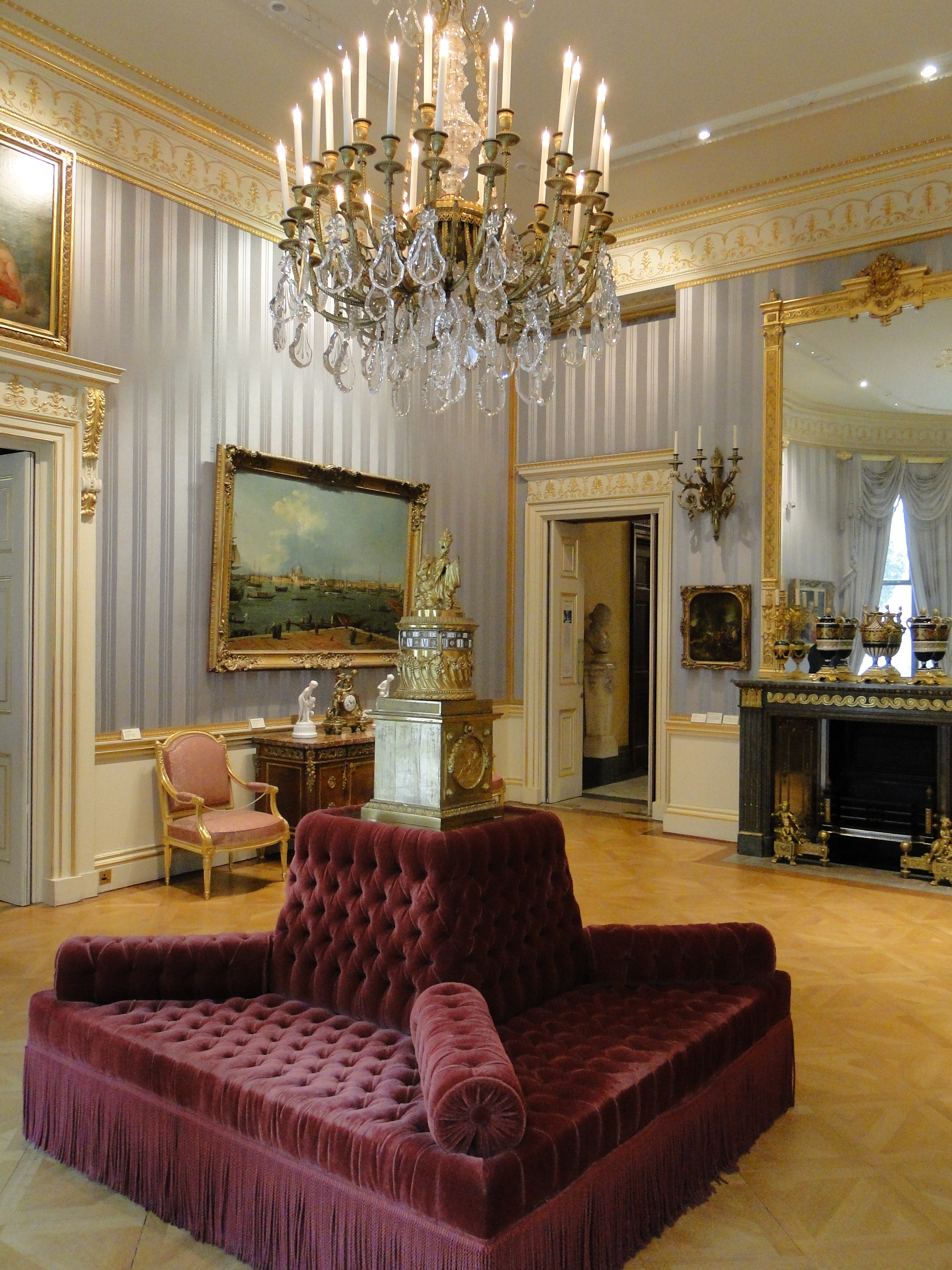
Dining Room

Displays: Eighteenth-century still lifes and portraits

The room contains masterworks of French 18th-century portraiture by Nattier and Houdon and two oil sketches by Jean François de Troy, for decoration of Louis XV's dining room in Fontainebleau, shown to the king for approval.

==== Billiard Room ====
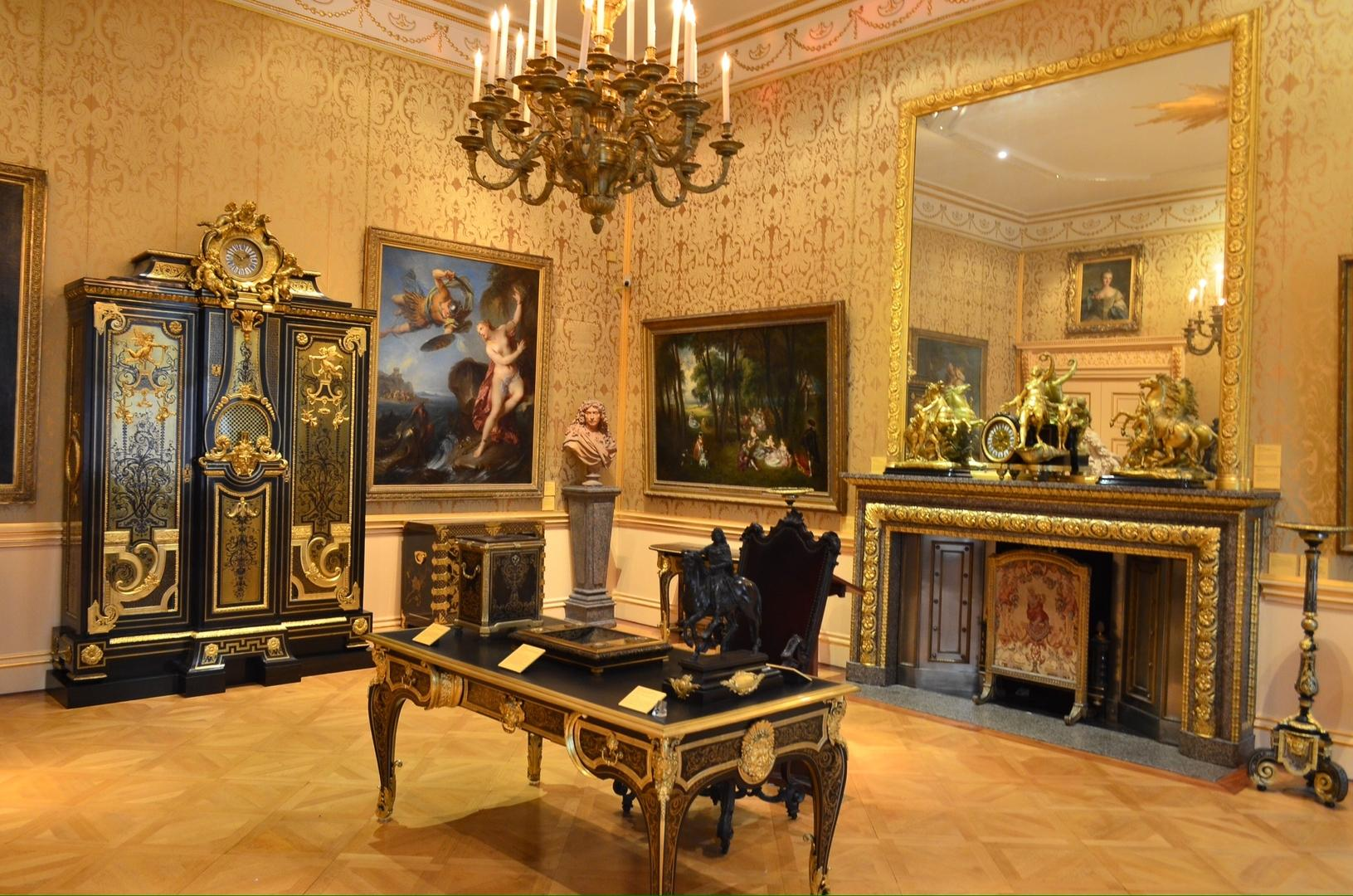
Billiard Room

Displays: The Decorative Arts under Louis XIV

==== Breakfast Room ====
Visitor Reception and Cloakroom

This room was formerly Sir Richard and Lady Wallace's breakfast room. In 1890, it contained a large cabinet filled with Sèvres porcelain dinner wares, probably more for use than decoration, and sixteen Dutch pictures. The French chimneypiece in this room was made in the mid-18th century and installed in this room when the house was modified for Sir Richard and Lady Wallace.

==== Housekeeper's Room ====
Wallace Collection Shop

This room was occupied during Sir Richard and Lady Wallace's lifetime by the family's housekeeper. Lady Wallace's housekeeper was Mrs Jane Buckley, a Londoner by birth. There were over thirty servants, including housemaids, kitchen maids, a lady's maid, a butler, footmen, a valet, coachmen, a groom and stable lads.

==== Oriental Armoury ====
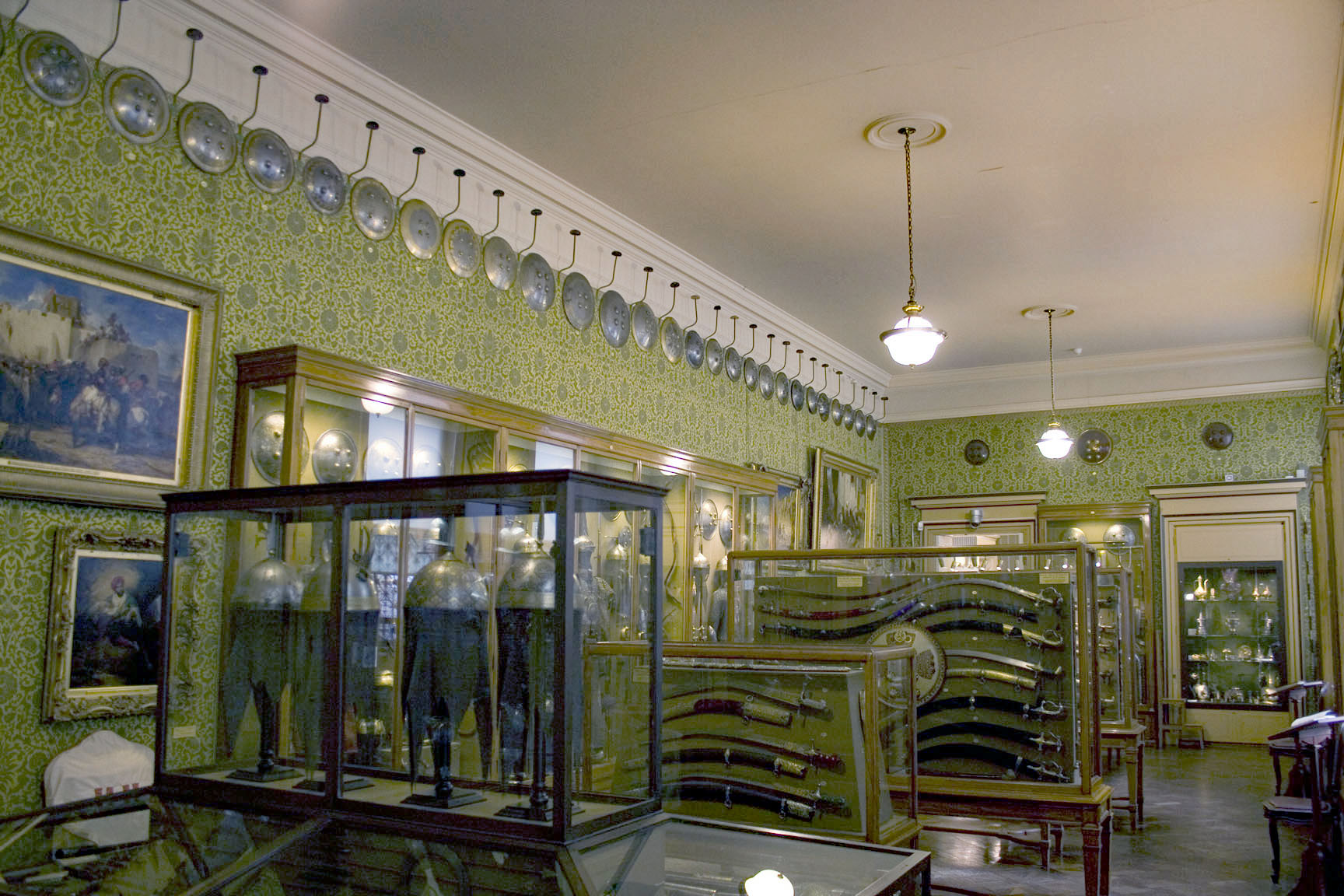
Oriental Armoury

Displays: East European, Turkish and Indo-Persian Arms, Armour and Works of Arts

The Oriental arms and armour in the Wallace Collection were largely collected by the 4th Marquess of Hertford in the 1860s, the last decade of his life. Like many of his contemporaries, Sir Richard Wallace used this material to bring Oriental exoticism, as it was then considered, into his fashionable London house. The Oriental Armoury was displayed on the first floor of Hertford House. Trophies of arms and armour from India, the Middle East, the lands of the old Ottoman Empire, and the Far East, patterned the walls of the Oriental Armoury, whilst the ceiling was decorated with a pattern of gold stars on a deep blue background.

==== European Armoury I ====
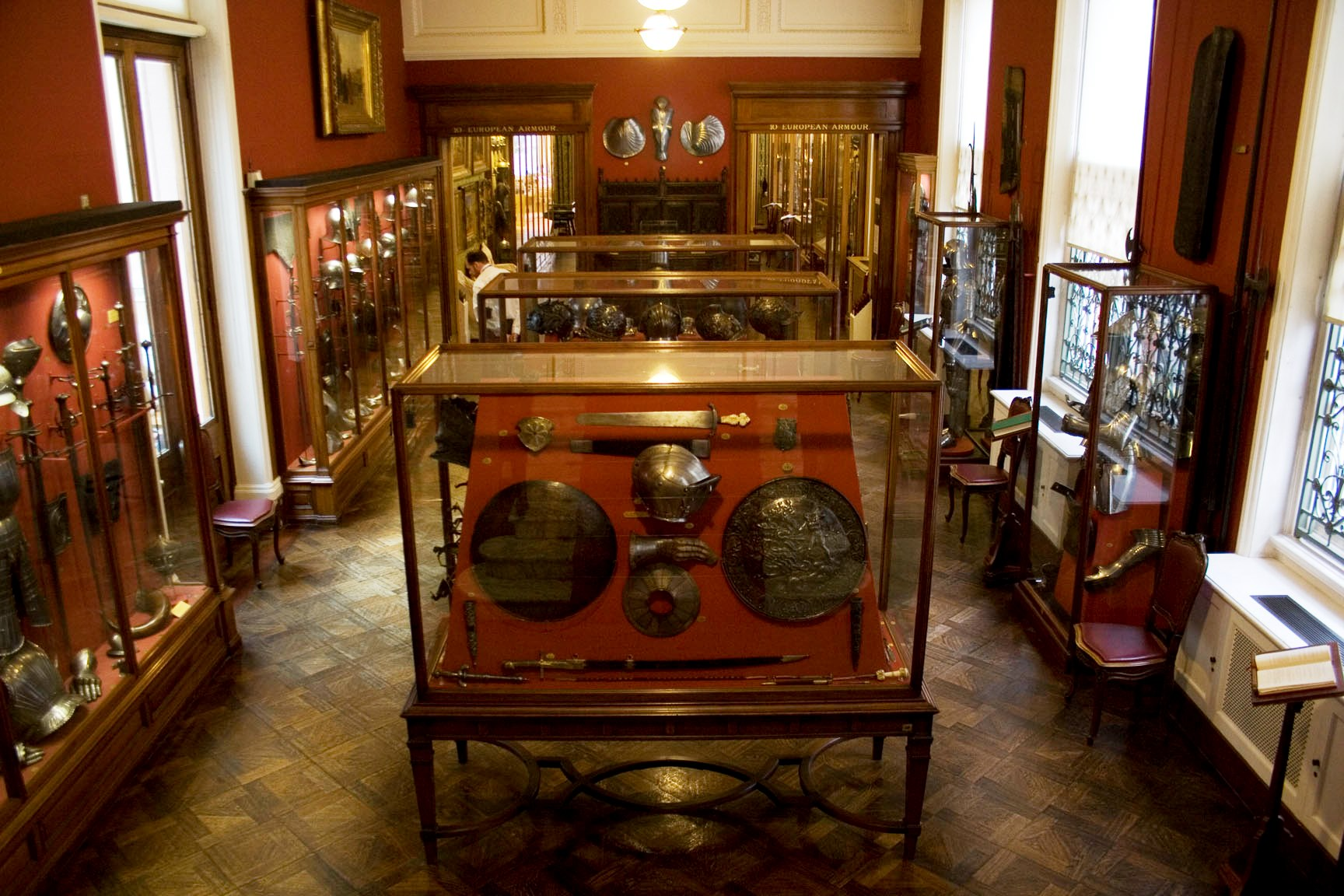
European Armoury I

Displays: Medieval and Renaissance Arms and Armour (tenth to sixteenth centuries)

Sir Richard Wallace acquired most of his European armour in 1871, when he bought the collections of the comte Alfred Emilien de Nieuwekerke, Minister of Fine Arts to Napoleon III and director of the Louvre, as well as the finest parts of the collection of Sir Samuel Rush Meyrick, a pioneering collector and scholar of arms and armour. The arms and armour collections are today recognised as among the finest in the world. During Sir Richard Wallace's lifetime, this room formed part of the stables with the grooms' bedrooms on a mezzanine floor. Sir Richard's European arms and armour were displayed in one large gallery, today's West Gallery III, on the first floor, directly above European Armoury I.

==== European Armoury II ====
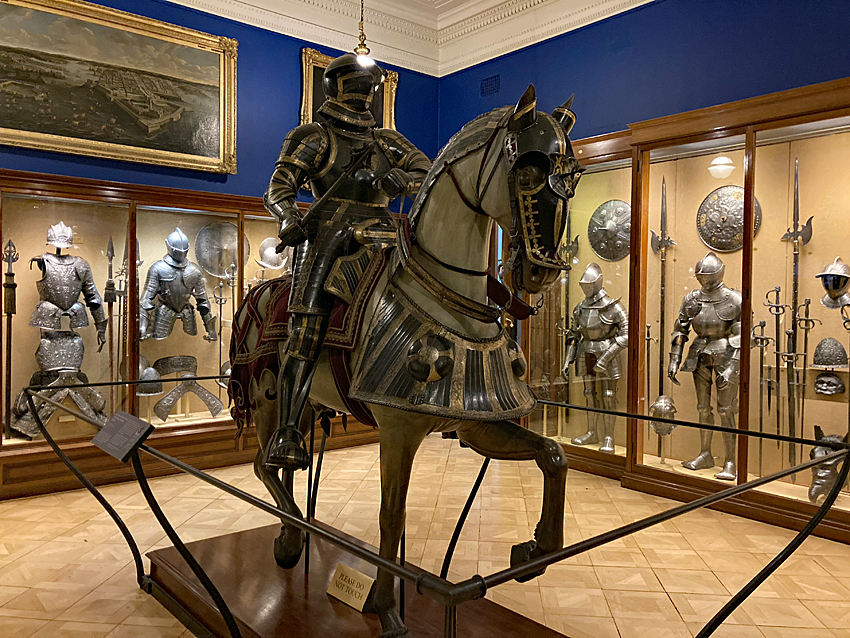
European Armoury II

Displays: Renaissance Arms and Armour (fifteenth to seventeenth centuries)

The Wallace Collection contains some of the most spectacular Renaissance arms and armour in Britain. All of the richest and most powerful noblemen of the 15th, 16th and 17th centuries commissioned ornately decorated weapons and armour, not just for war, but also for use in the jousts, tournaments and festivals of the time. Fine arms and armour were considered works of art as much as warlike equipment. Displayed in this gallery are noteworthy examples of the armourer's art and sculptures richly embellished with gold and silver. This space was formerly part of Sir Richard Wallace's stables.

==== European Armoury III ====
Displays: Later Arms and Armour (sixteenth to nineteenth centuries)

The array of sporting guns, rifles and pistols in this room includes a large number of extravagantly decorated 16th- and early-17th-century wheel-lock firearms, together with a group of ornate civilian flint-lock guns of the Napoleonic era. Several of the weapons here were made for European rulers, including Louis XIII and Louis XIV of France and Tsar Nicholas I of Russia. It is a major collection of early firearms in the United Kingdom. This space was formerly part of Sir Richard Wallace's coach house and stable yard.

==== Sixteenth-Century Gallery ====
Displays: The Collector's Cabinet

The Sixteenth-Century Gallery houses works of art from the Medieval and Renaissance periods and a group of important Renaissance paintings. This part of the Wallace Collection was mainly assembled by Sir Richard who, like many 19th-century collectors, was fascinated by the art and history of Europe during the Middle Ages and Renaissance. The Sixteenth-Century Gallery comprised two smaller rooms during Sir Richard and Lady Wallace's lifetime. The contemporary photograph shows how one room was arranged by Sir Richard as a cabinet of curiosities, with paintings and maiolica densely hung on the walls and smaller works of art kept in cases or inside Renaissance cabinets. The other room, known as the Canaletto Room, was used to display the collection of paintings by Canaletto.

==== Smoking Room ====
Displays: Medieval, Renaissance and Baroque Works of Art

The Smoking Room exhibits paintings and works of art from the Medieval and Renaissance periods, including the greater part of Sir Richard Wallace's collection of Italian Renaissance maiolica. Sir Richard Wallace would have invited his male guests to the Smoking Room after dinner, to discuss affairs of the day over an enjoyable pipe or cigar. The room had oriental interiors, with walls lined with Turkish-style tiles made by the Minton factory in Stoke-on-Trent, the floor laid with a patterned mosaic. A small section of this interior survives in the alcove at the north end of the room. This was not only a highly fashionable look for a late Victorian smoking room but also practical, ensuring the smell of smoke did not linger in any fabric furnishings.

=== First Floor ===
==== Landing ====
The Landing serves as the main orientation point on the first floor. It is hung with mythological and pastoral paintings by Boucher and is also perhaps the best place to admire the wrought iron work of the staircase balustrade, made in 1719 for the Royal bank in Paris. Hertford House was built in 1776–78 for the 4th Duke of Manchester. After a brief spell as the Spanish Embassy, it was bought by the 2nd Marquess of Hertford in 1797. He added the conservatory, in place of a Venetian window on the Landing and two first-floor rooms on each wing.

==== Great Gallery ====
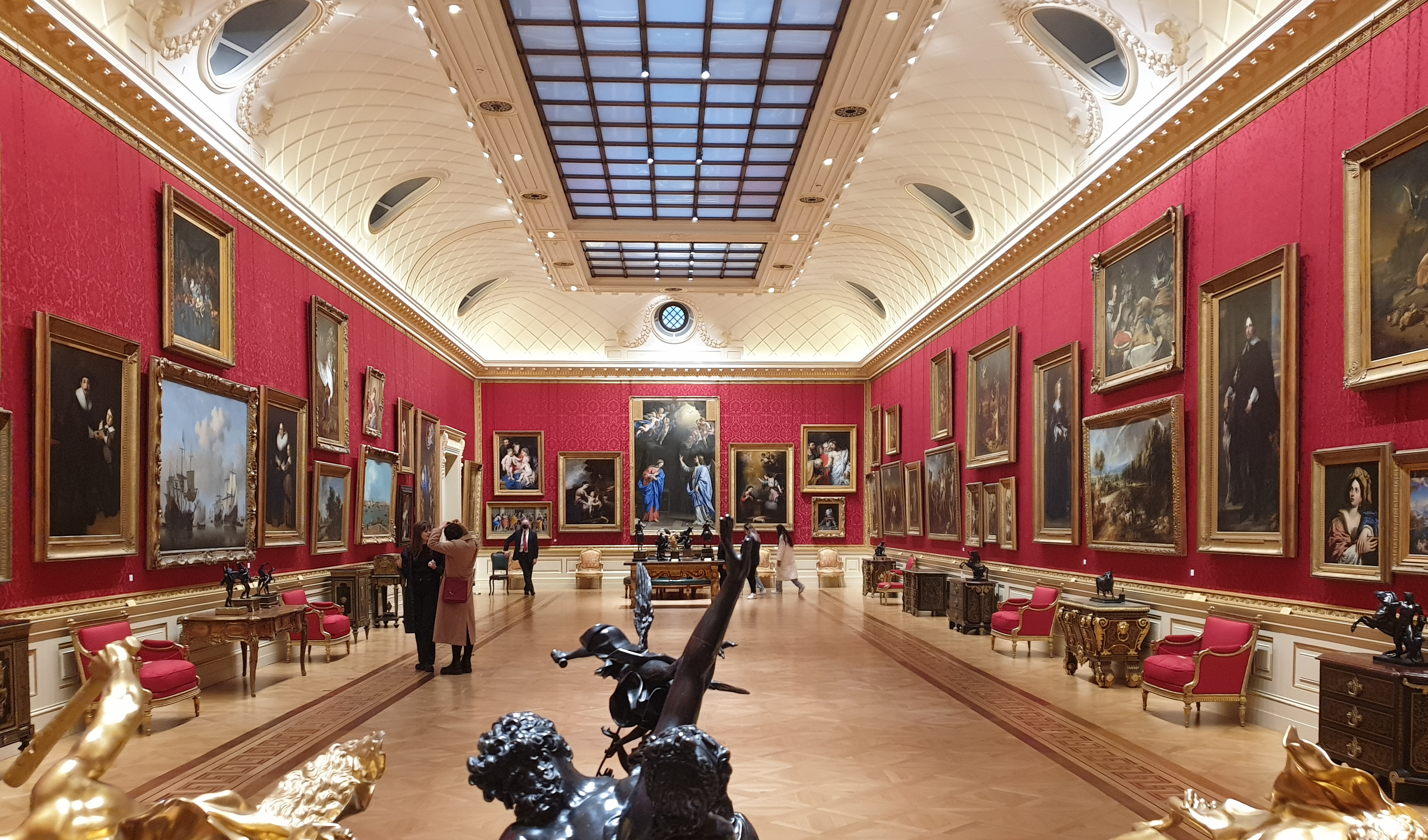
The Great Gallery

Displays: Old Masters

==== Large Drawing Room ====
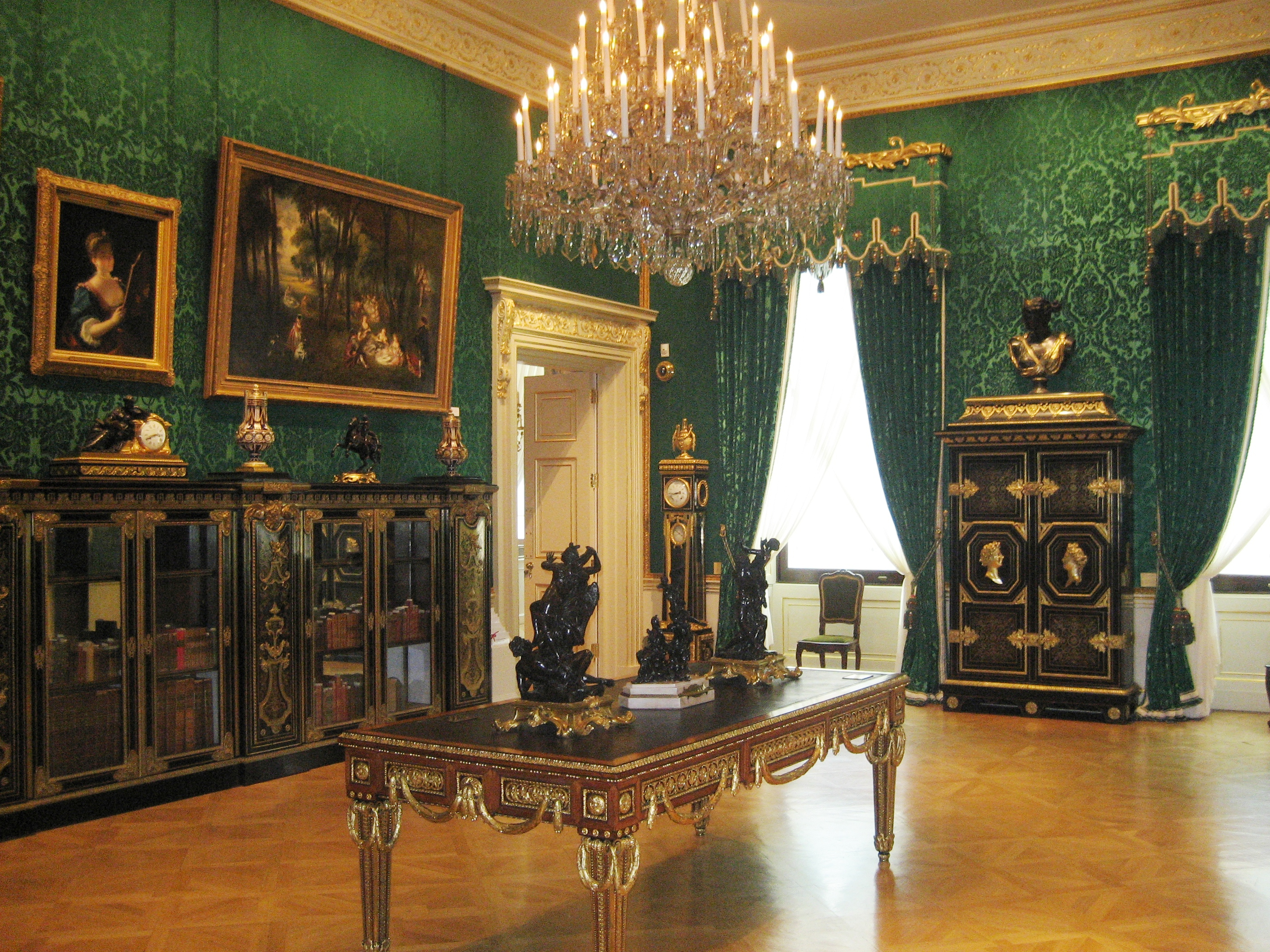
Large Drawing Room

Displays: French furniture.

Contains some of the most spectacular works by the French furniture-maker, Andre-Charles Boulle

==== Small Drawing Room ====
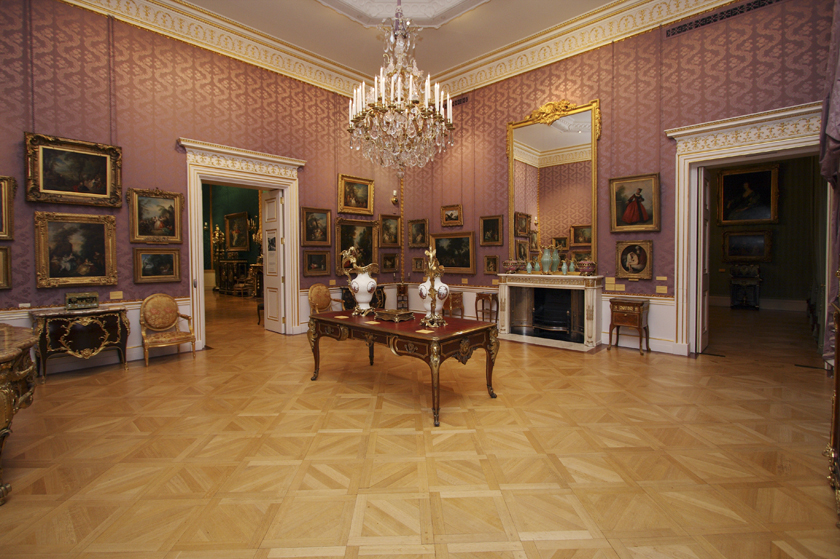
The Small Drawing Room

==== Oval Drawing Room ====
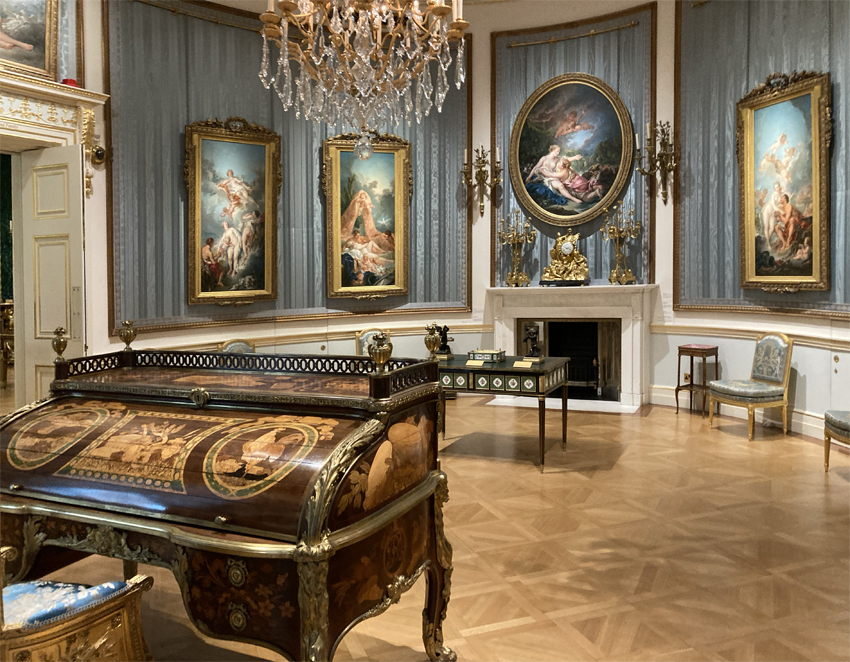
Oval drawing room

Displays: French furniture and paintings by François Boucher

=== Lower Ground Floor ===
==== Porphyry Court ====
The Porphyry Court was little more than a rather dismal back yard until 2000, when it was transformed by being doubled in size and provided with a dramatic pair of flights of stairs.

== Collections ==
The Collection numbers nearly 5,500 objects, a range of fine and decorative arts from the 15th to the 19th centuries. The collection is known for its 18th-century French paintings, Sèvres porcelain and French furniture but also displays other objects, such as arms and armour featuring both European and Oriental objects, as well as displays of gold boxes, miniatures, sculpture and medieval and Renaissance works of art such as maiolica, glass, bronzes and Limoges enamels.

The works of art in the Collection comprise:

- Paintings, watercolours and drawings 775
- Furniture 528
- Ceramics 510
- European and Oriental arms and armour 2,370
- Sculpture 466
- Miniatures 334
- Medieval and Renaissance works of art 363
- Goldsmiths' work 120
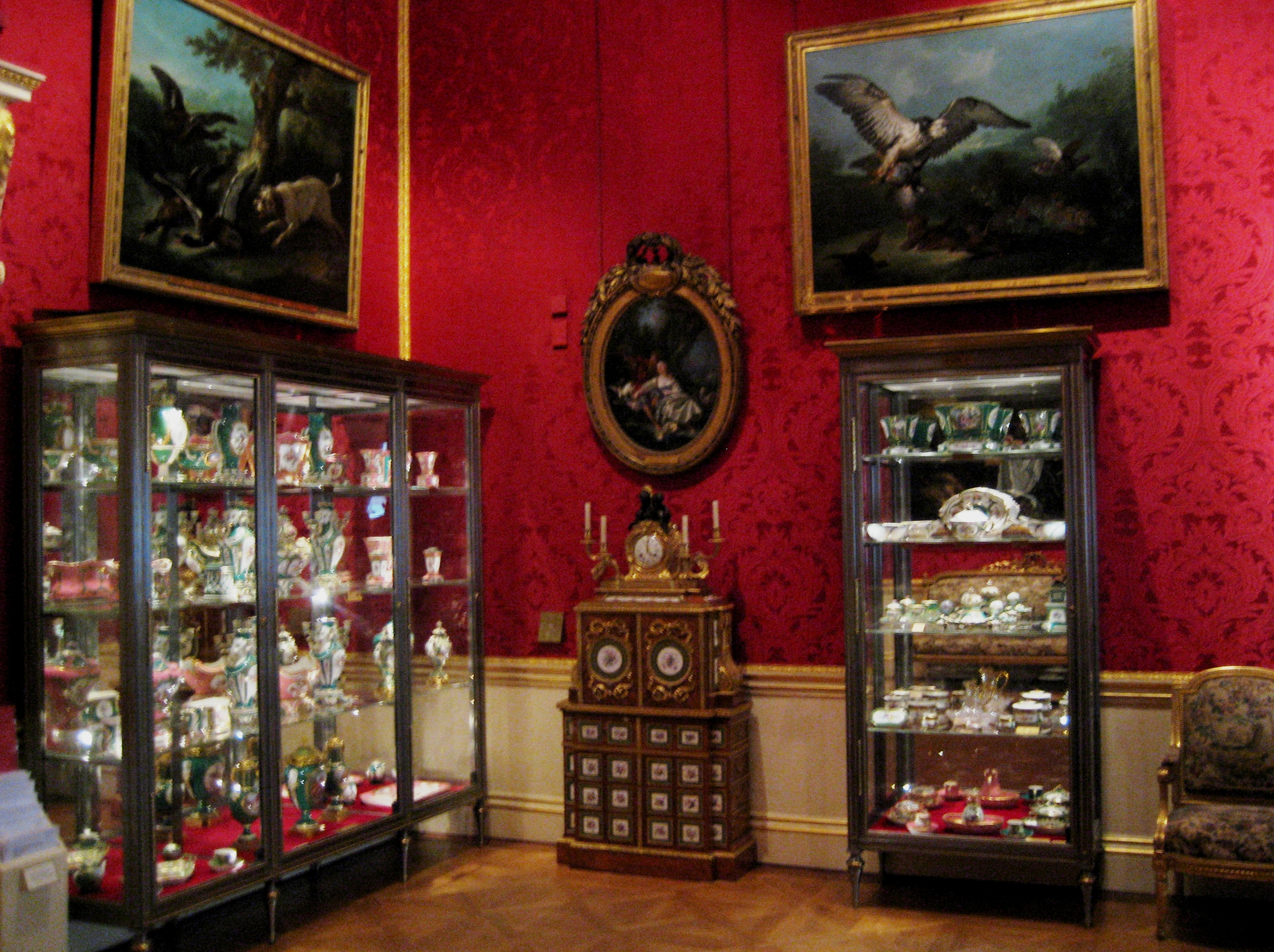
Part of the Wallace Collection's great ensemblage of Sèvres porcelain

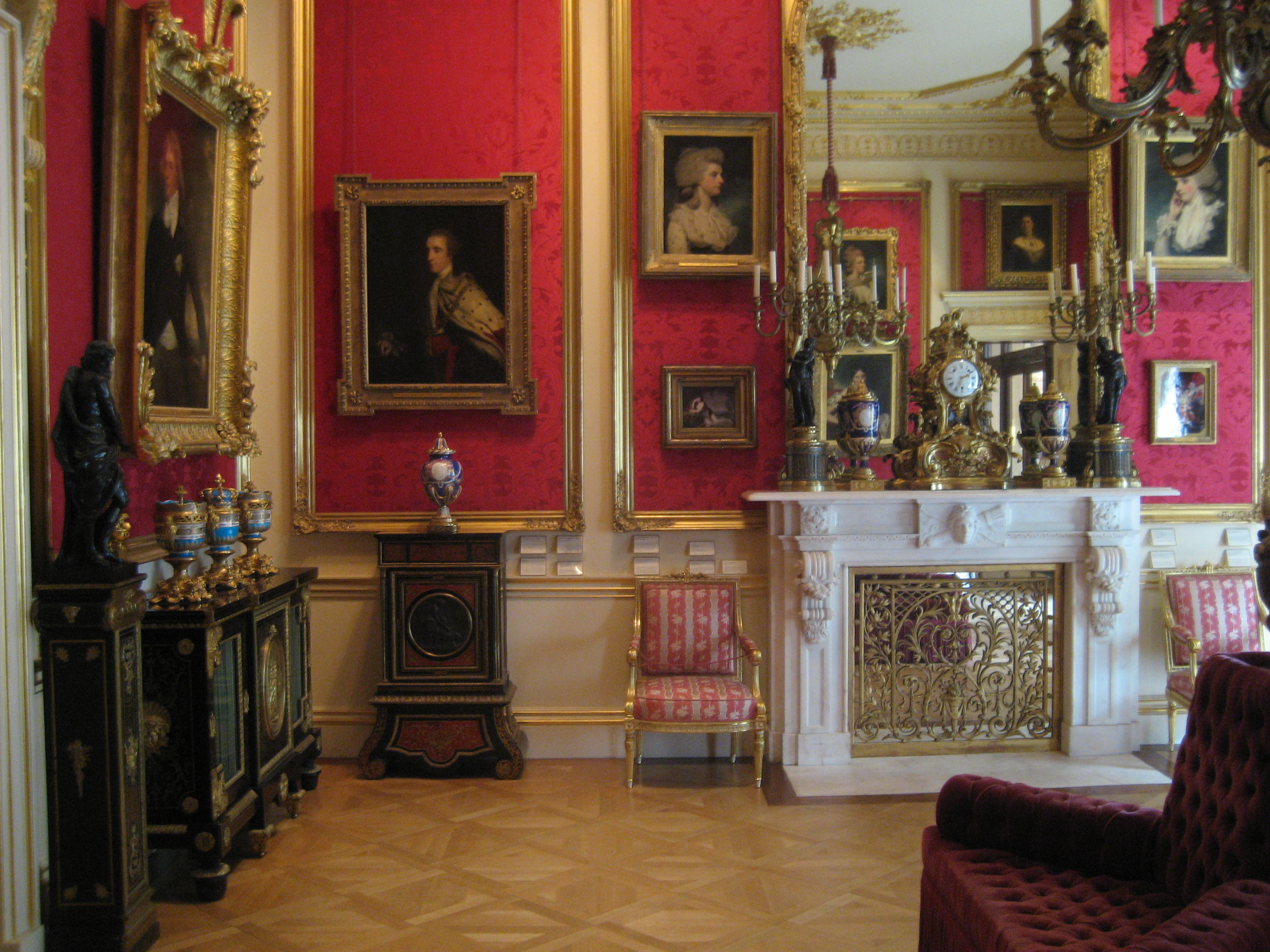
Front State Room – Redecorated in the mid-1990s to appear as though it would have in the late 19th century

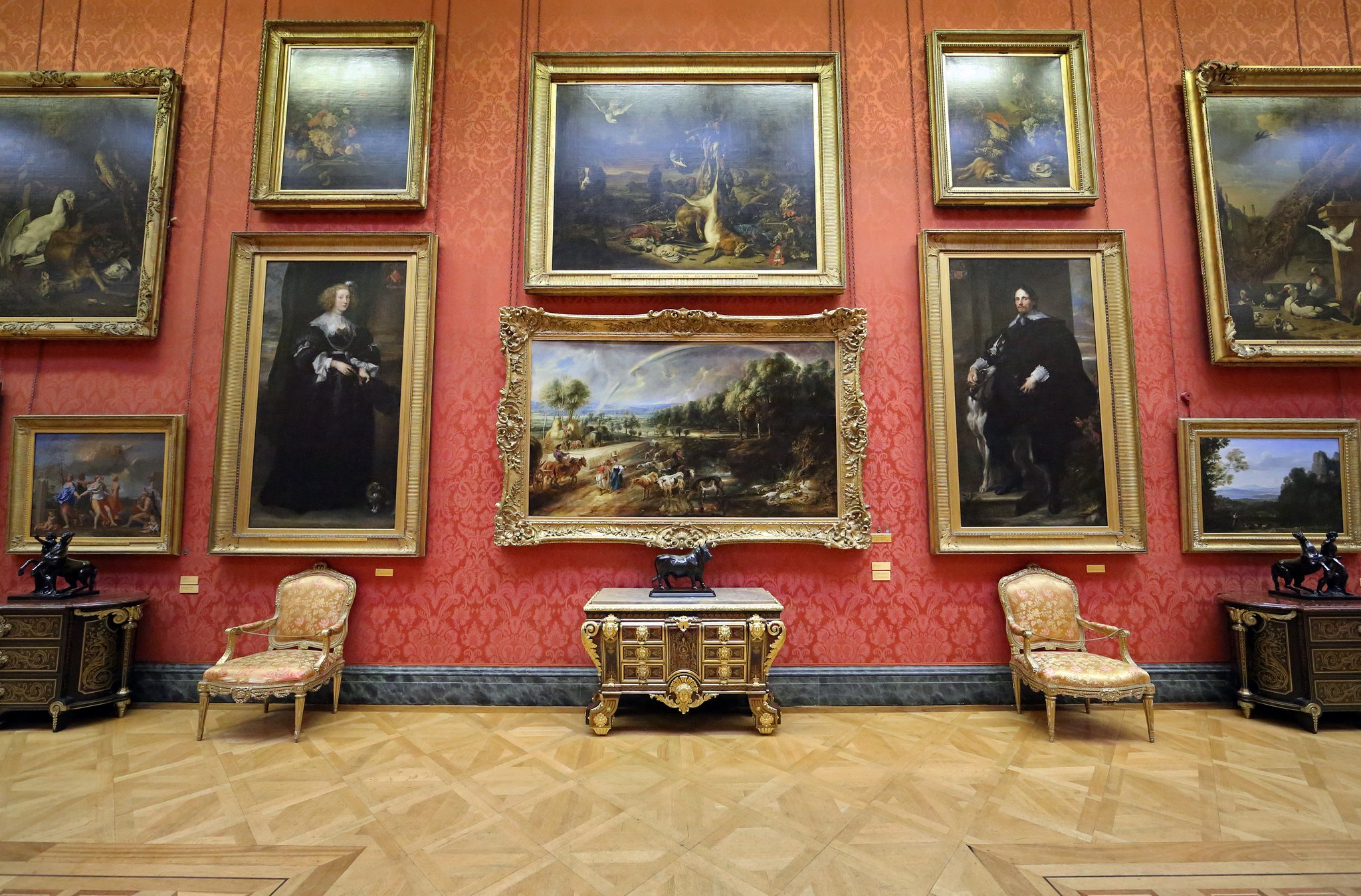
The Great Gallery in 2012, featuring Rubens' Landscape With A Rainbow, portraits by Van Dyck, and other important works

== Departments ==
The Wallace Collection is split into six curatorial departments: Pictures and Miniatures; Ceramics and Glass; Sculpture and Works of Art; Arms and Armour; Sèvres porcelain; and Gold Boxes and Furniture.

=== Pictures and miniatures ===
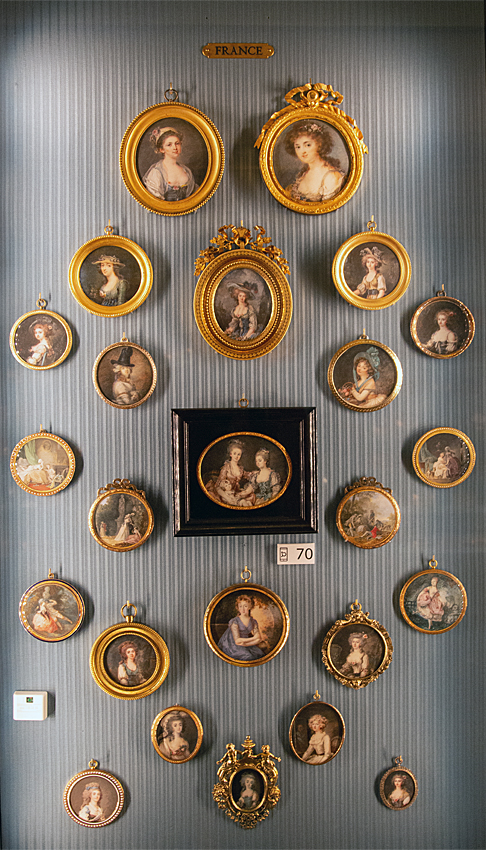
French miniatures displayed in the Boudoir cabinet

The Wallace Collection's Old Master paintings are some of the most prominent in the world, and date from the 14th to the mid-19th centuries. The highlights include Dutch and Flemish paintings of the 17th century, 18th- and 19th-century French paintings, and works by English, Italian and Spanish artists. Strengths of the collection include 5 Rembrandts (and school), 9 Rubens's, 4 Van Dycks, 8 Canalettos, 9 Guardis, 19 François Bouchers, Fragonard, 9 Murillos, 9 Teniers, 2 Titians, Poussin, 3 Velázquezs and 8 Watteaus. The inventory of pictures, watercolours and drawings comprises all the major European schools.

==== Paintings, drawing and watercolours in the collection ====
1. British, German, Spanish, and Italian – 151 paintings, 60 drawings
2. French (19th century) – 134 paintings, 57 watercolours
3. French (before 1815) – 144 paintings, 8 drawings and watercolours
4. Dutch – 173 paintings, 2 drawings
5. Flemish – 8 paintings

Dutch School:

- Ferdinand Bol – 1 painting
- Gerard ter Borch – 2 paintings
- Aelbert Cuyp – 5 paintings
- Gerrit Dou – 1 painting
- Frans Hals – 1 painting
- Bartholomeus van der Helst – 1 painting
- Meyndert Hobbema – 5 paintings
- Melchior d'Hondecoeter – 3 paintings
- Pieter de Hooch – 2 paintings
- Gabriel Metsu – 5 paintings
- Adriaen van Ostade – 2 paintings
- Isack van Ostade – 2 paintings
- Rembrandt – 5 paintings
- Jacob Isaakszoon van Ruisdael – 4 paintings
- Frans Snyders – 1 painting
- Jan Steen – 5 paintings
- Adriaen van de Velde – 2 paintings
- Willem van de Velde the Younger – 8 paintings
- Jan Weenix – 13 paintings

Philips Wouwerman – 6 paintings

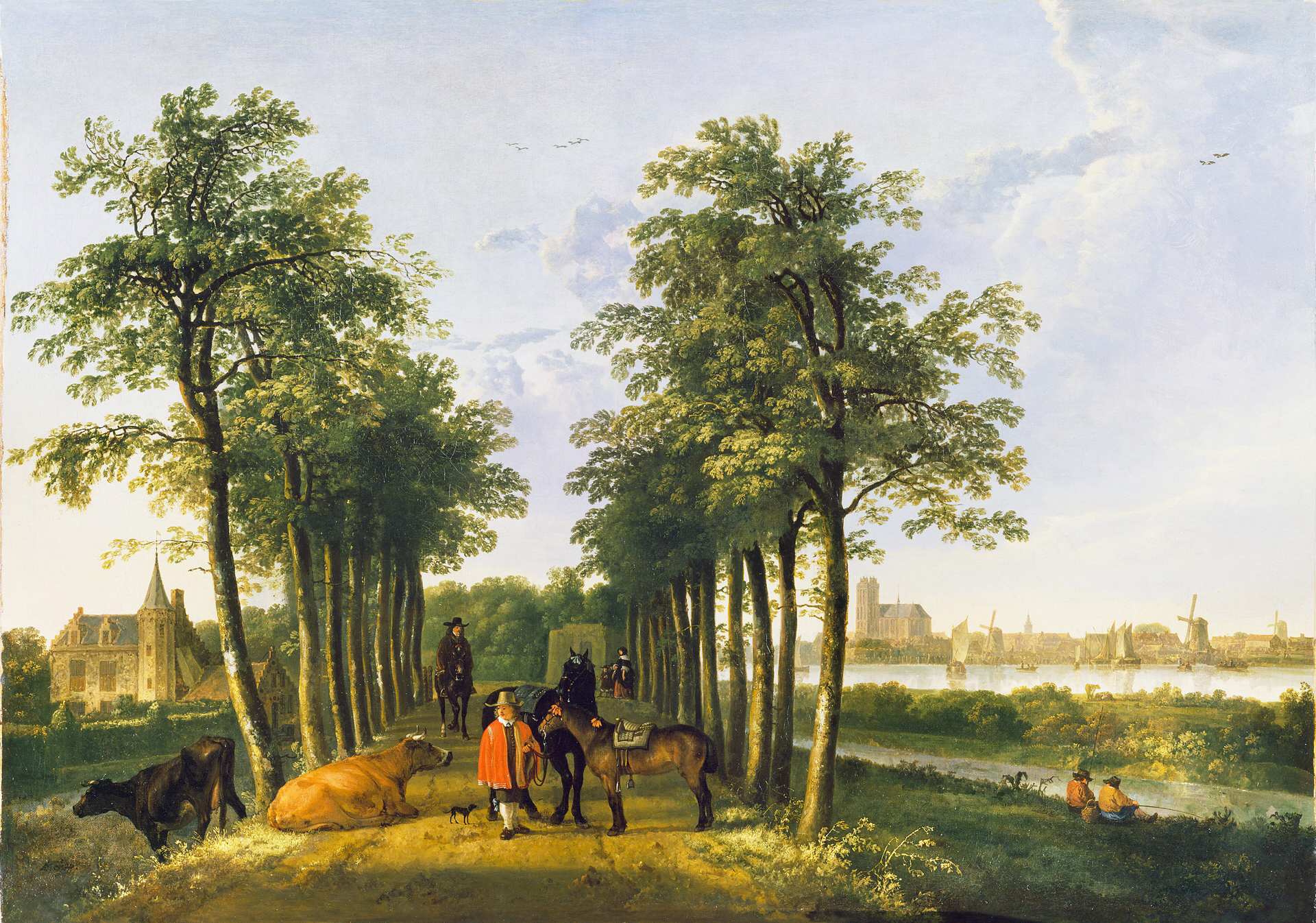
Aelbert Cuyp – The Avenue at Meerdervoort, 1650–1652

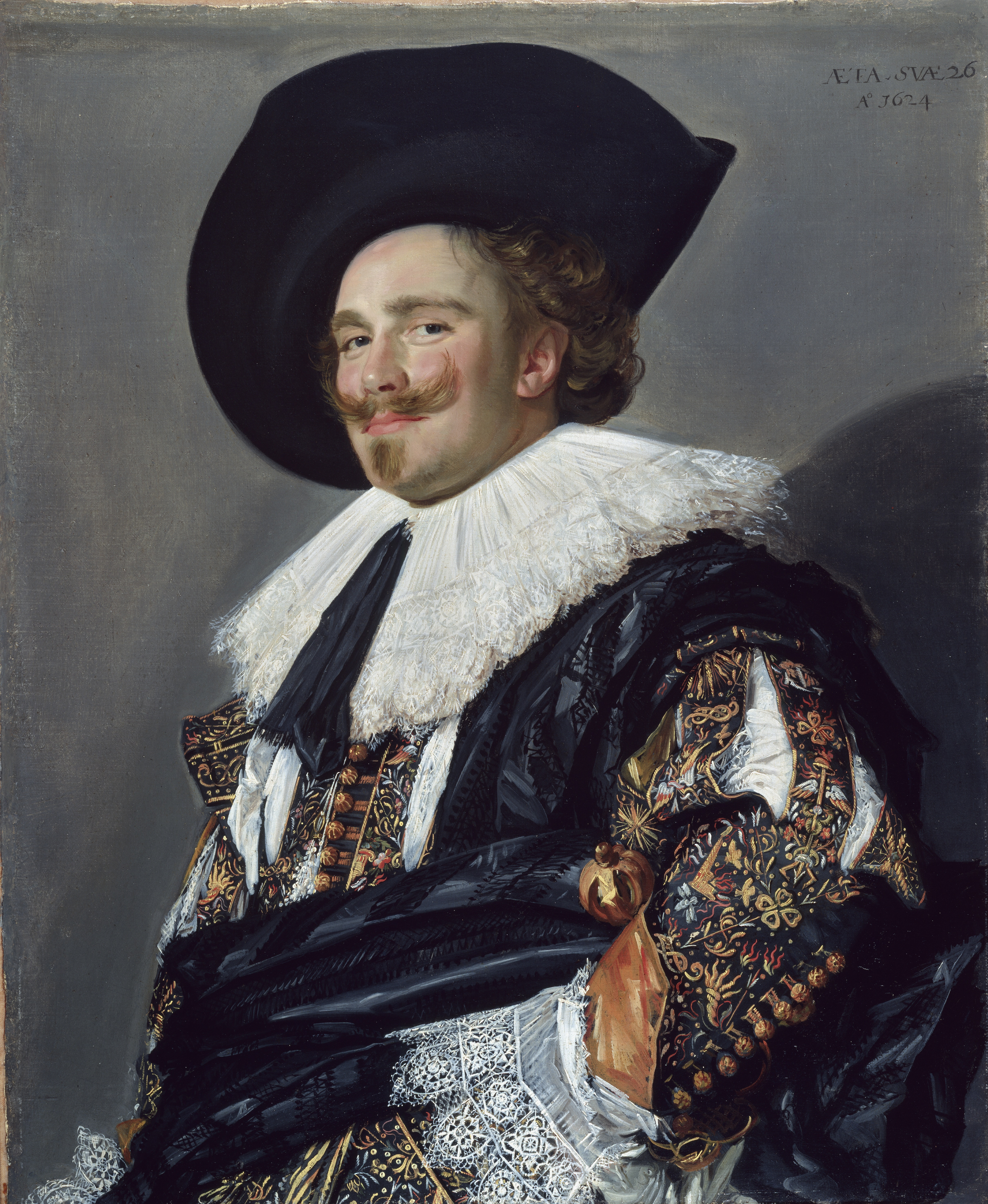
Frans Hals – The Laughing Cavalier, 1624

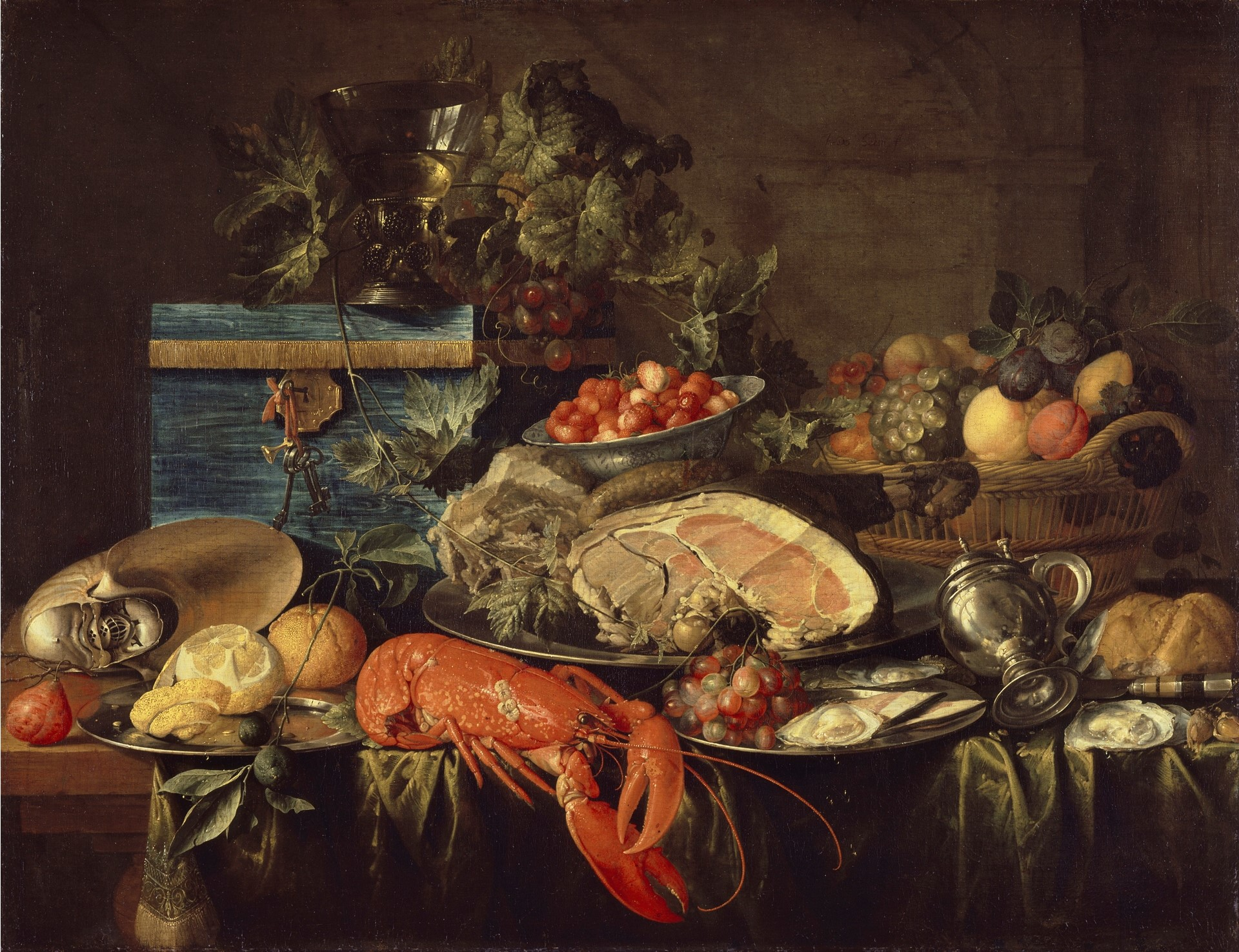
Jan Davidsz de Heem – Still life with Lobster, 1643

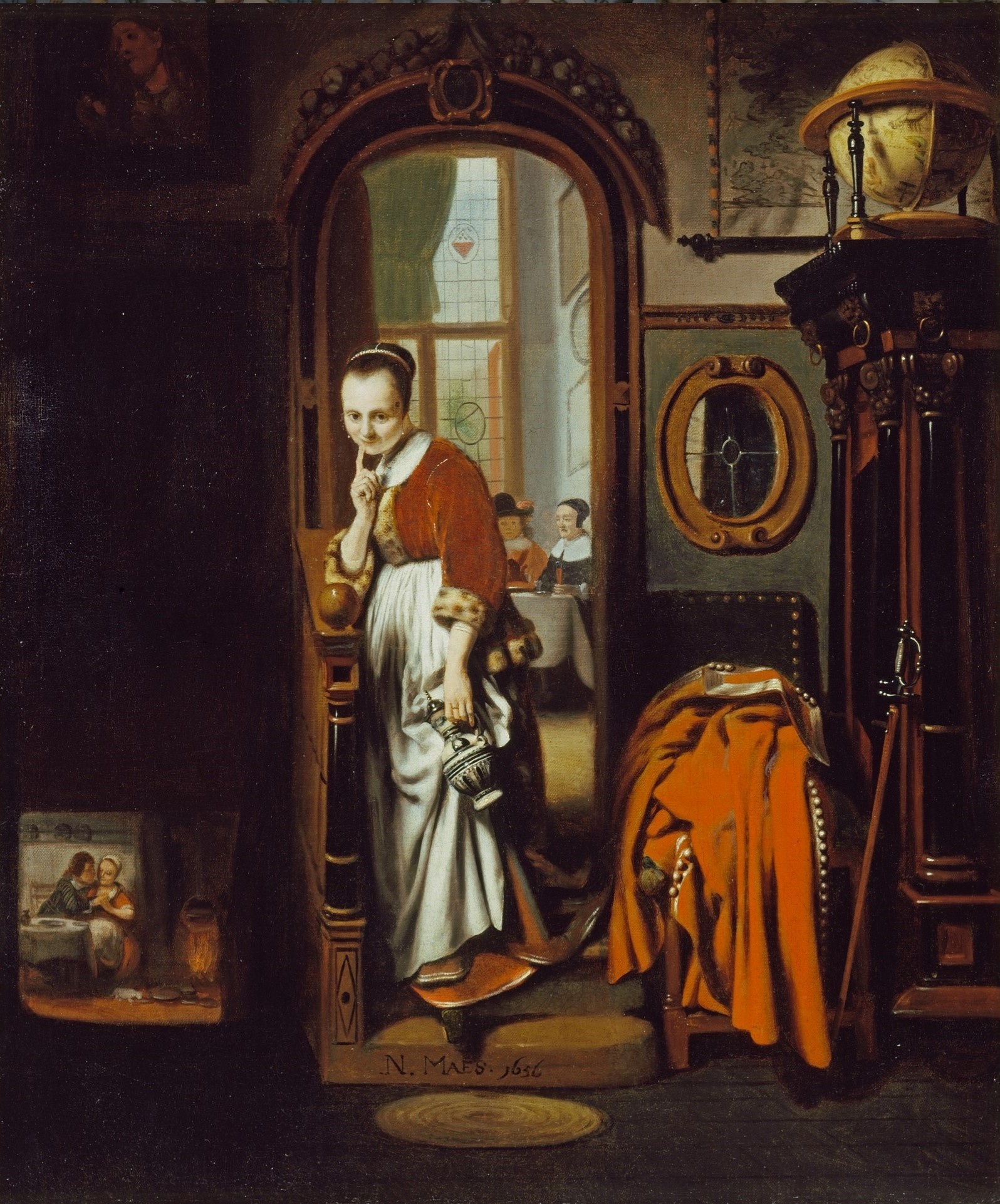
Nicolaes Maes – The Listening Housewife, 1656

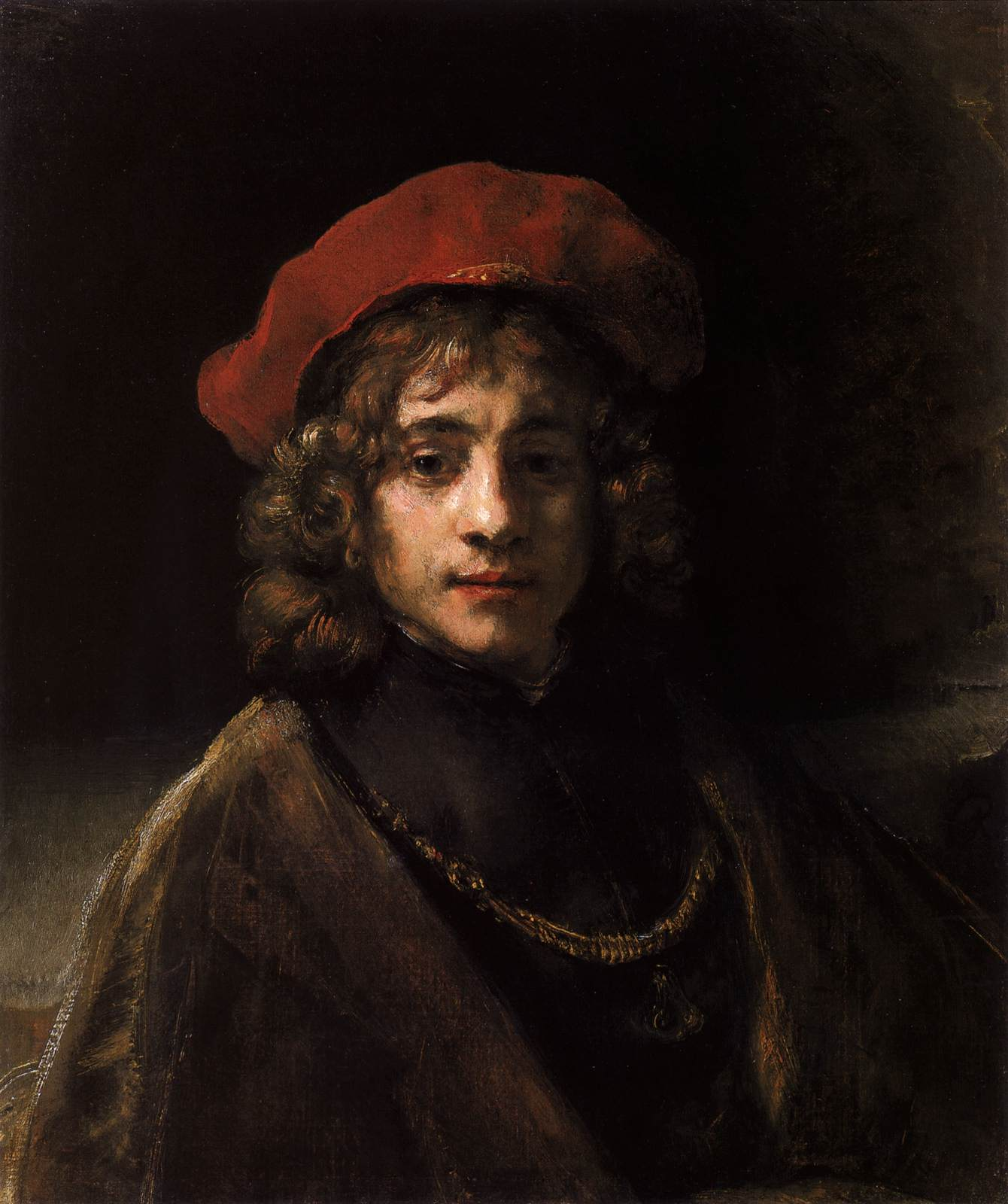
Rembrandt – The Artist's Son Titus, c. 1657

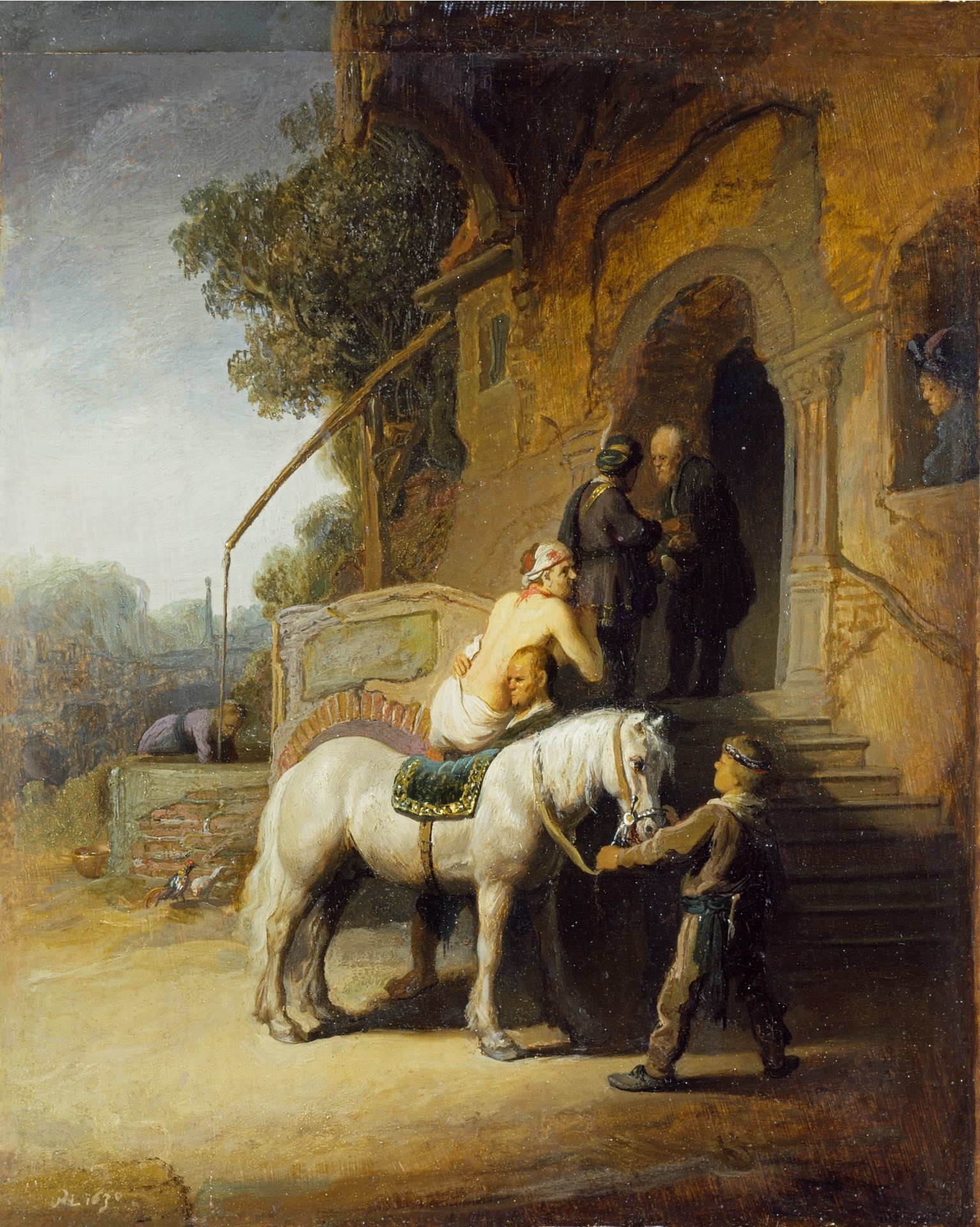
Rembrandt – The Good Samaritan, 1630

English School

- Richard Parkes Bonington – 35 paintings
- Thomas Gainsborough – 2 paintings
- John Hoppner – 1 painting
- Sir Edwin Landseer – 4 paintings
- Thomas Lawrence – 5 paintings
- Joshua Reynolds – 12 paintings
- J. M. W. Turner – 4 paintings

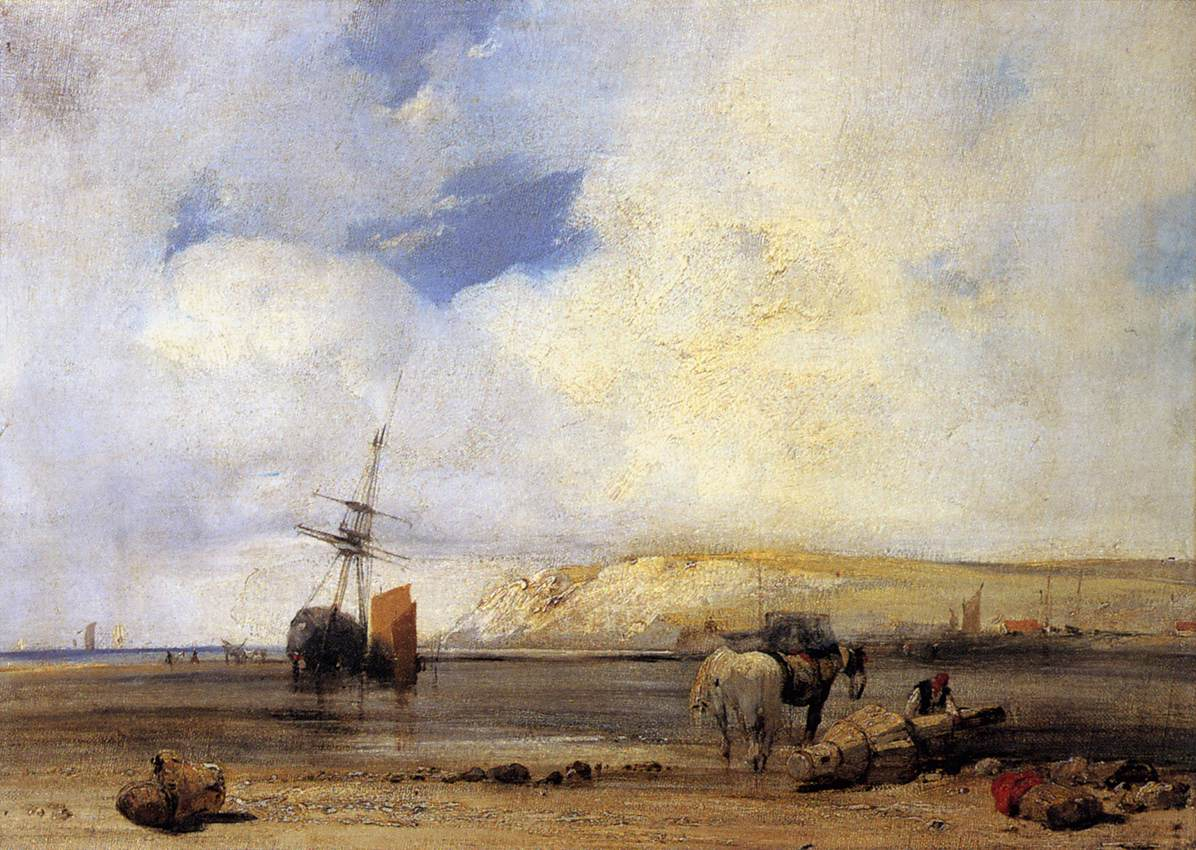
Richard Parkes Bonington - On the Coast of Picardy

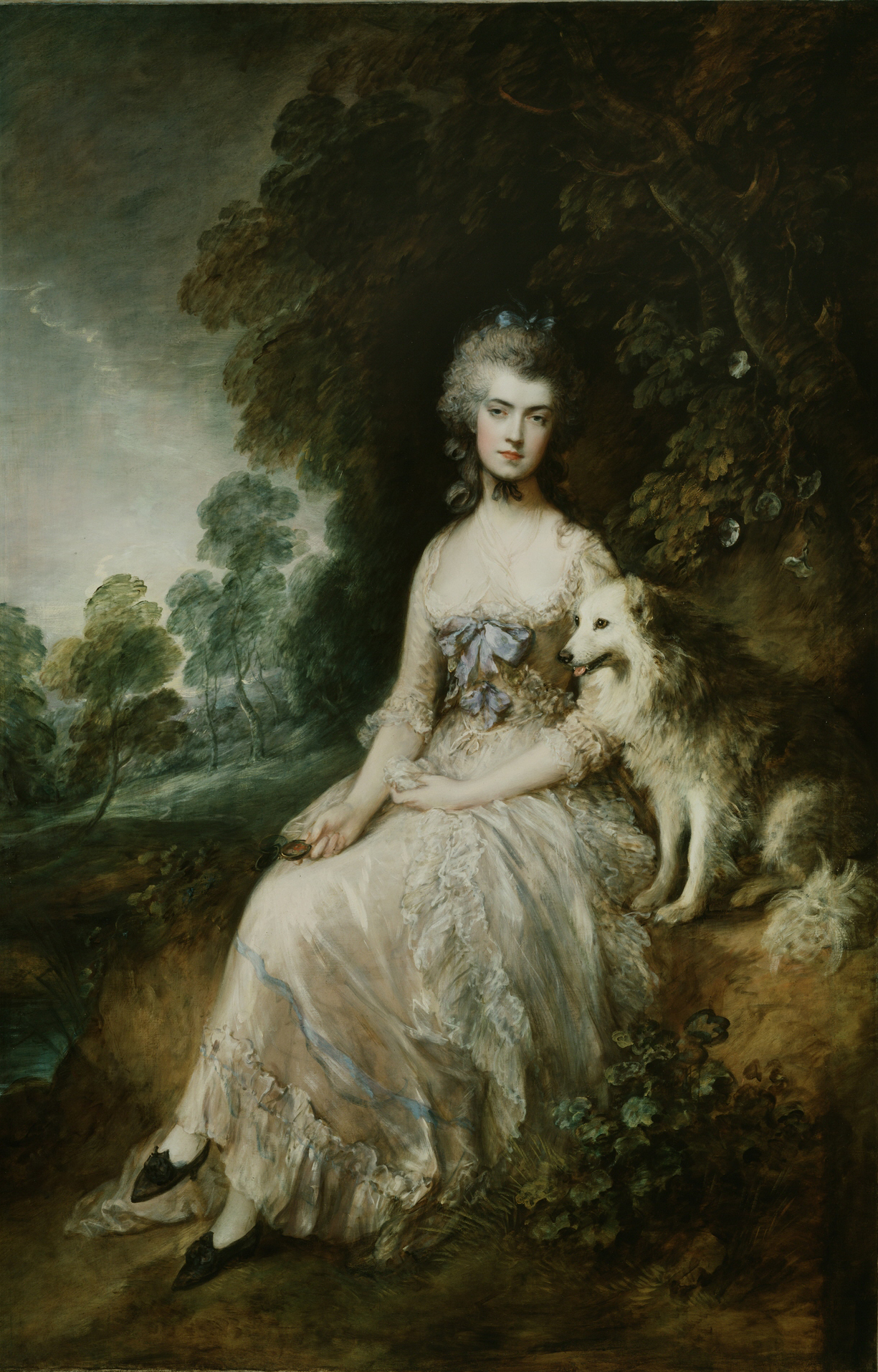
Thomas Gainsborough – Mrs Mary Robinson (Perdita), c. 1781

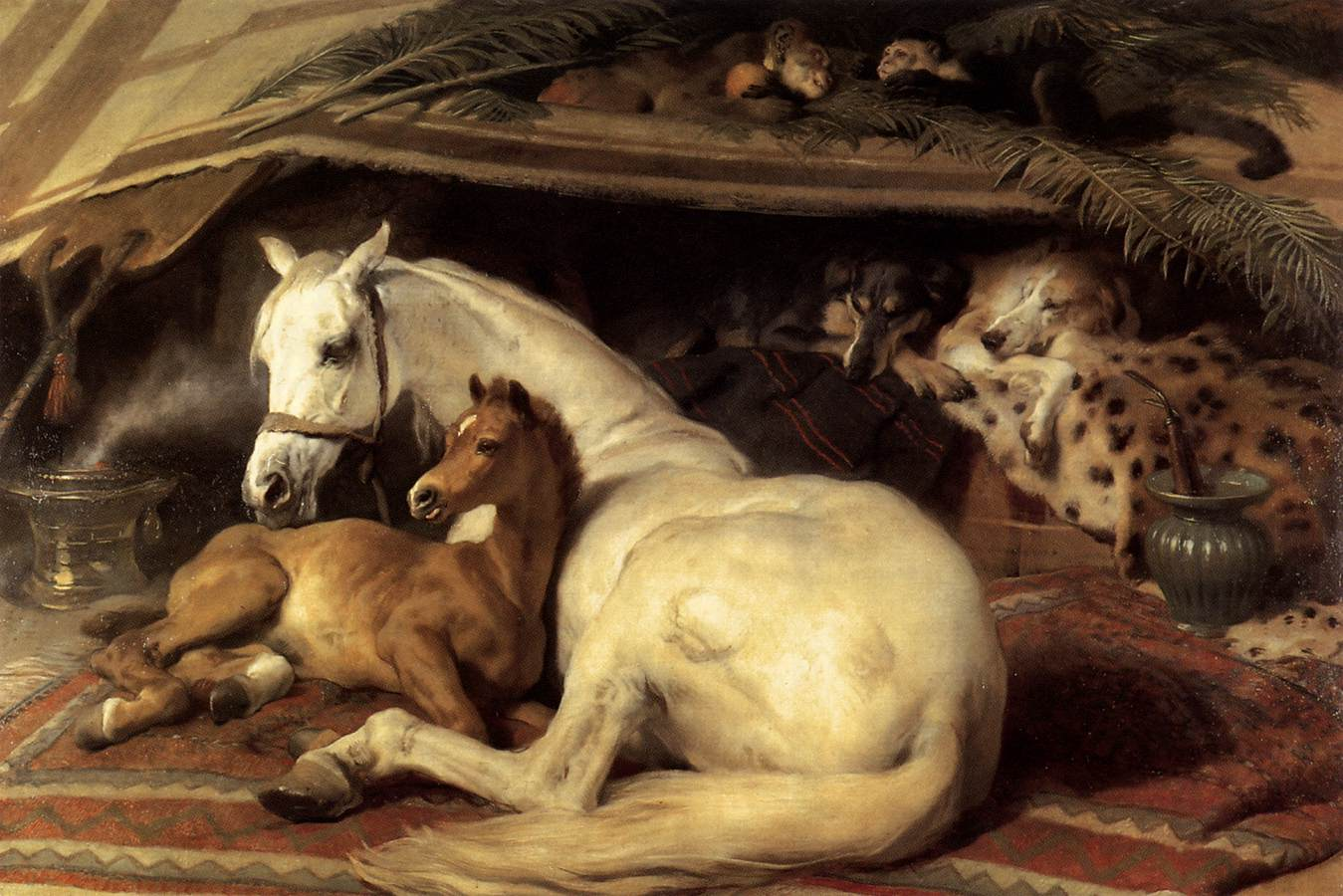
Edwin Landseer – The Arab Tent, 1866

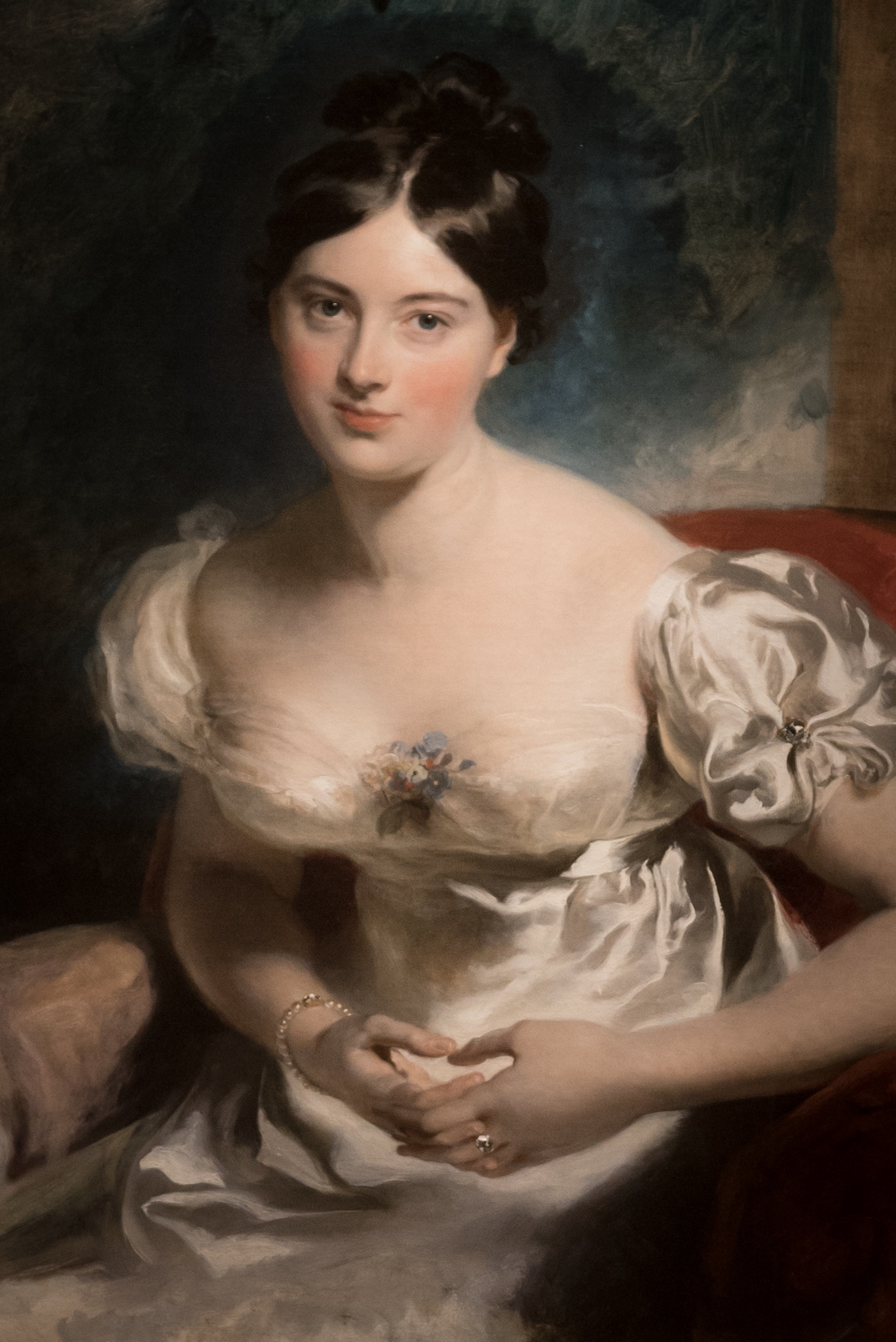
Thomas Lawrence – Portrait of the Countess of Blessington, 1822

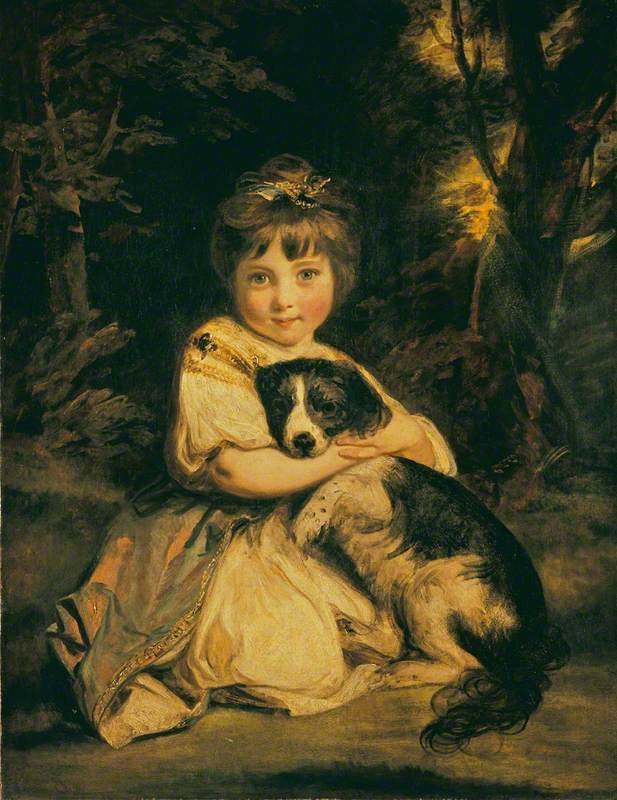
Joshua Reynolds - Miss Jane Bowles

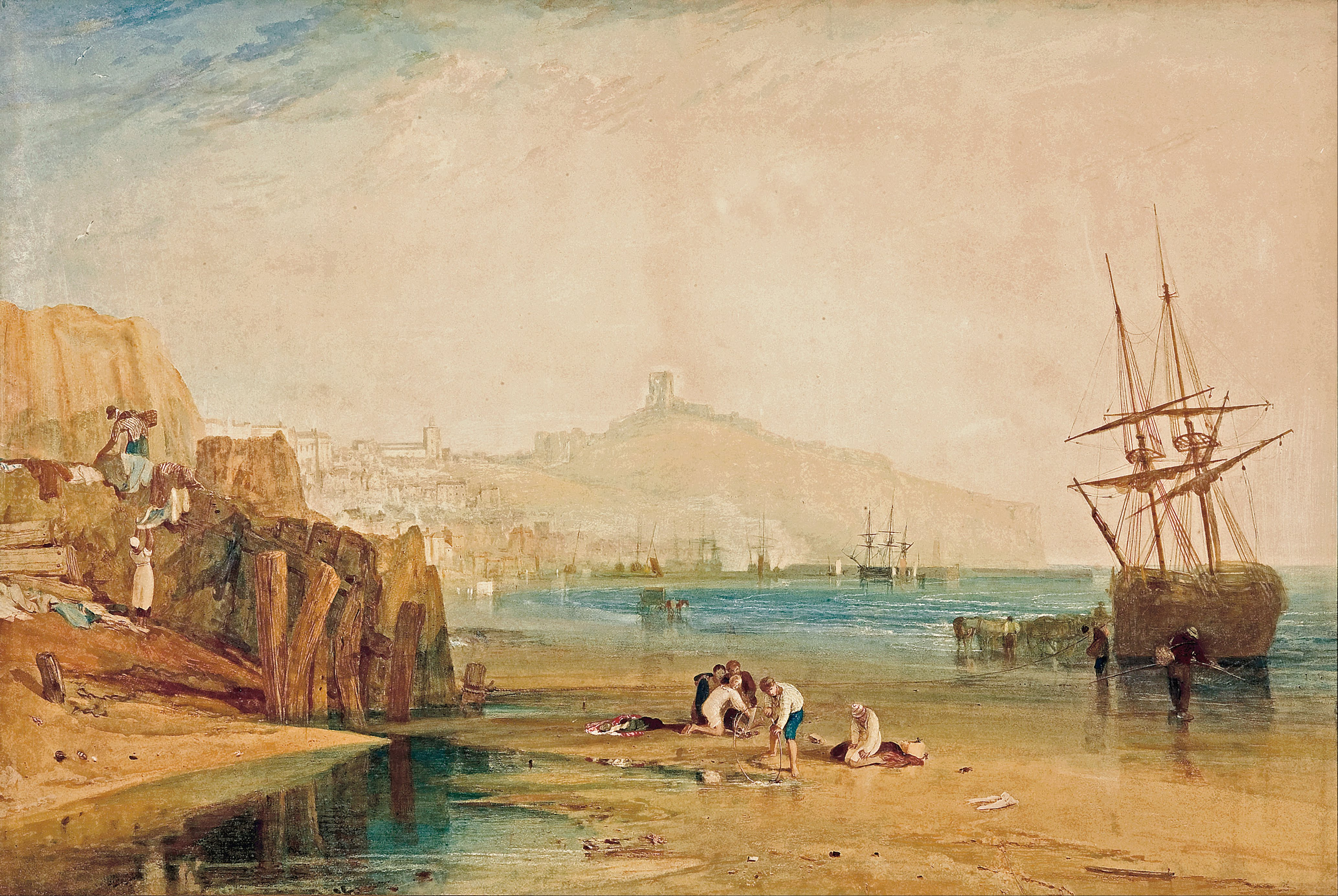
J.M.W. Turner - Scarborough town and castle- morning- boys catching crabs

Flemish School

- Hans Memling – 1 painting
- Pieter Pourbus – 1 painting
- Pourbus the Elder, Frans – 1 painting
- Peter Paul Rubens – 9 paintings
- David Teniers the Younger – 9 paintings
- Anthony van Dyck – 4 paintings

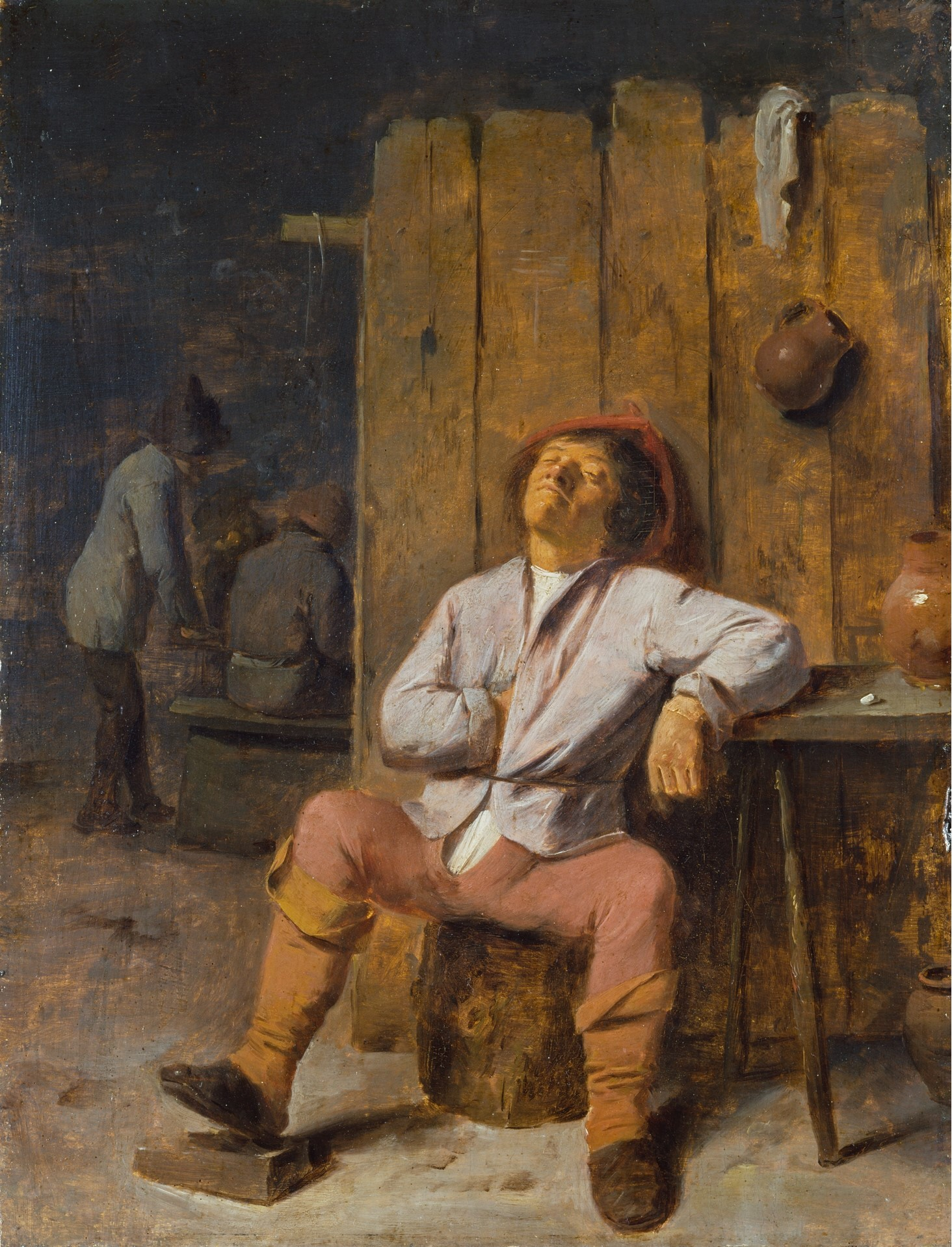
Adriaen Brouwer – Sleeping peasant, 1630–1638

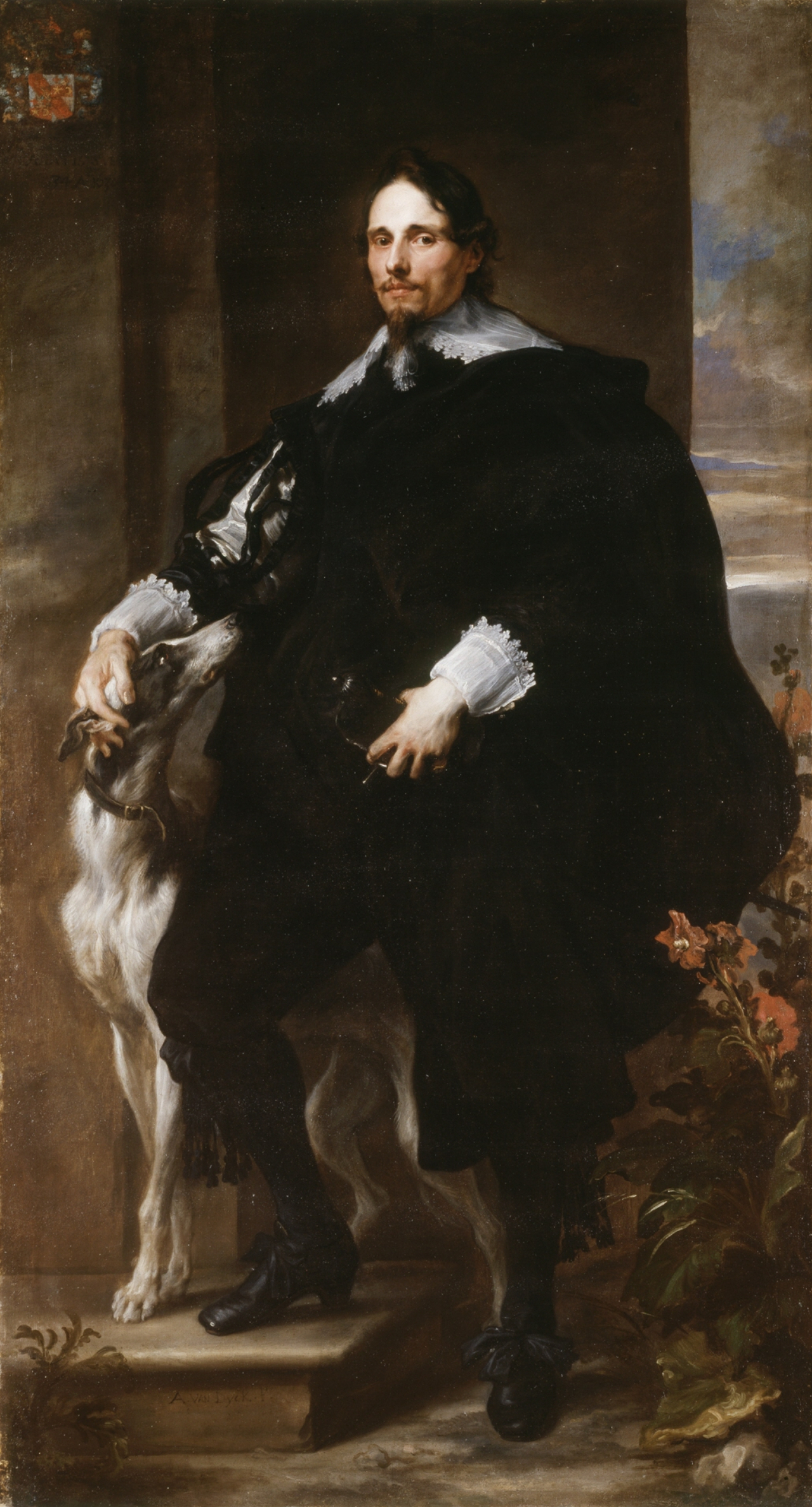
Anthony van Dyck – Portrait of Philippe Le Roy, 1630

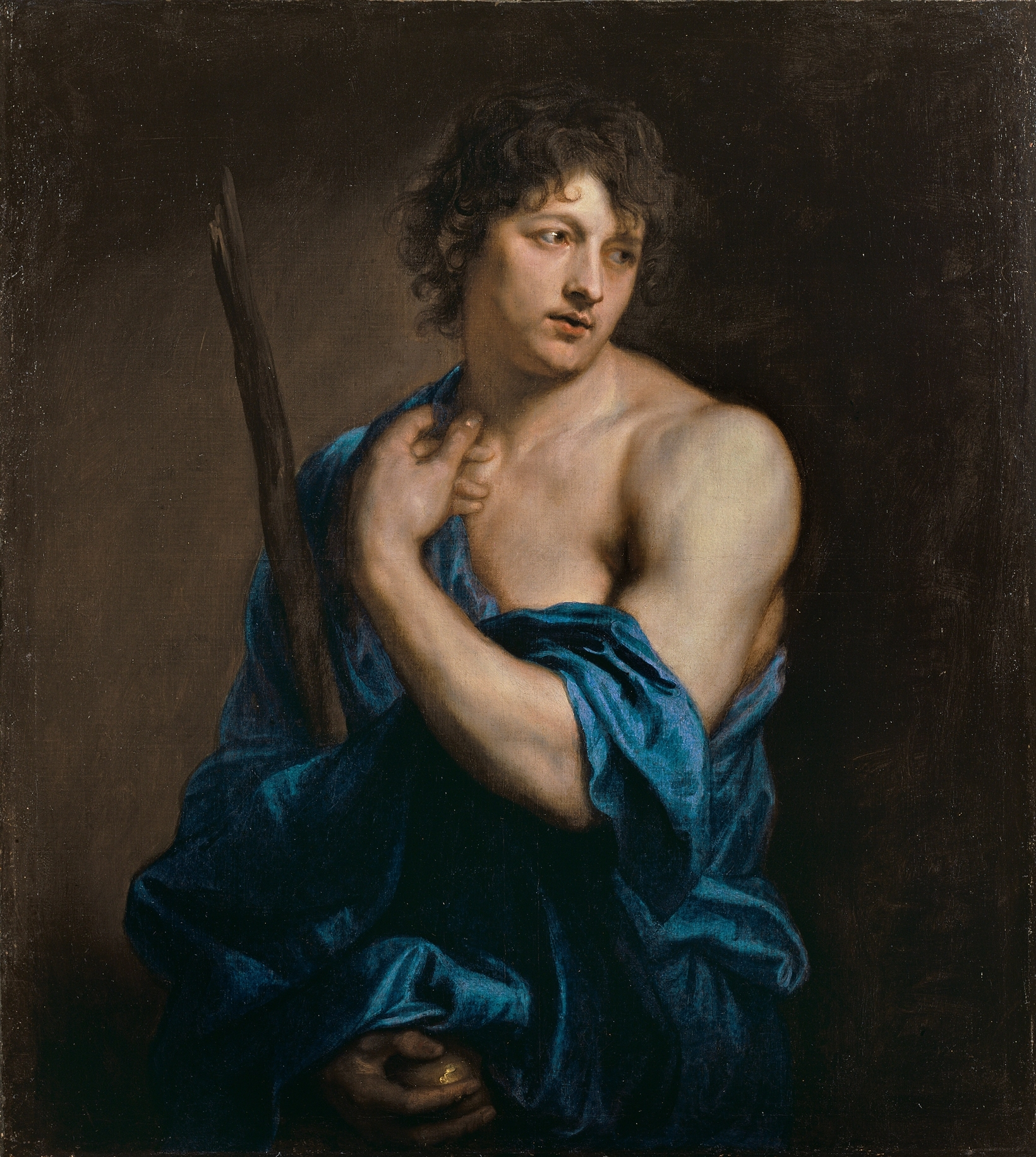
Anthony van Dyck – The Shepherd Paris, c. 1628

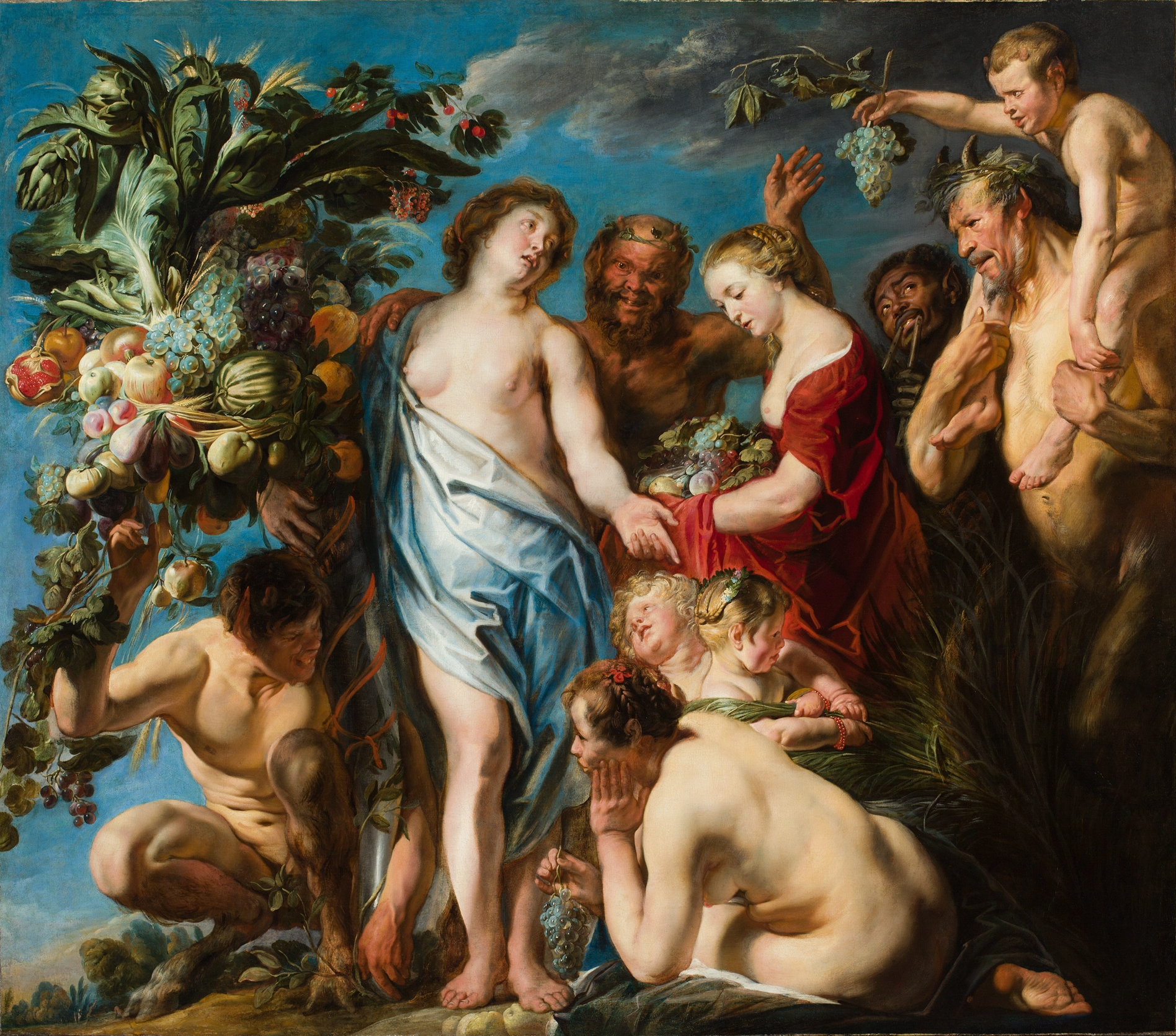
Jacob Jordaens – An Allegory of Fruitfulness, 1620–1629

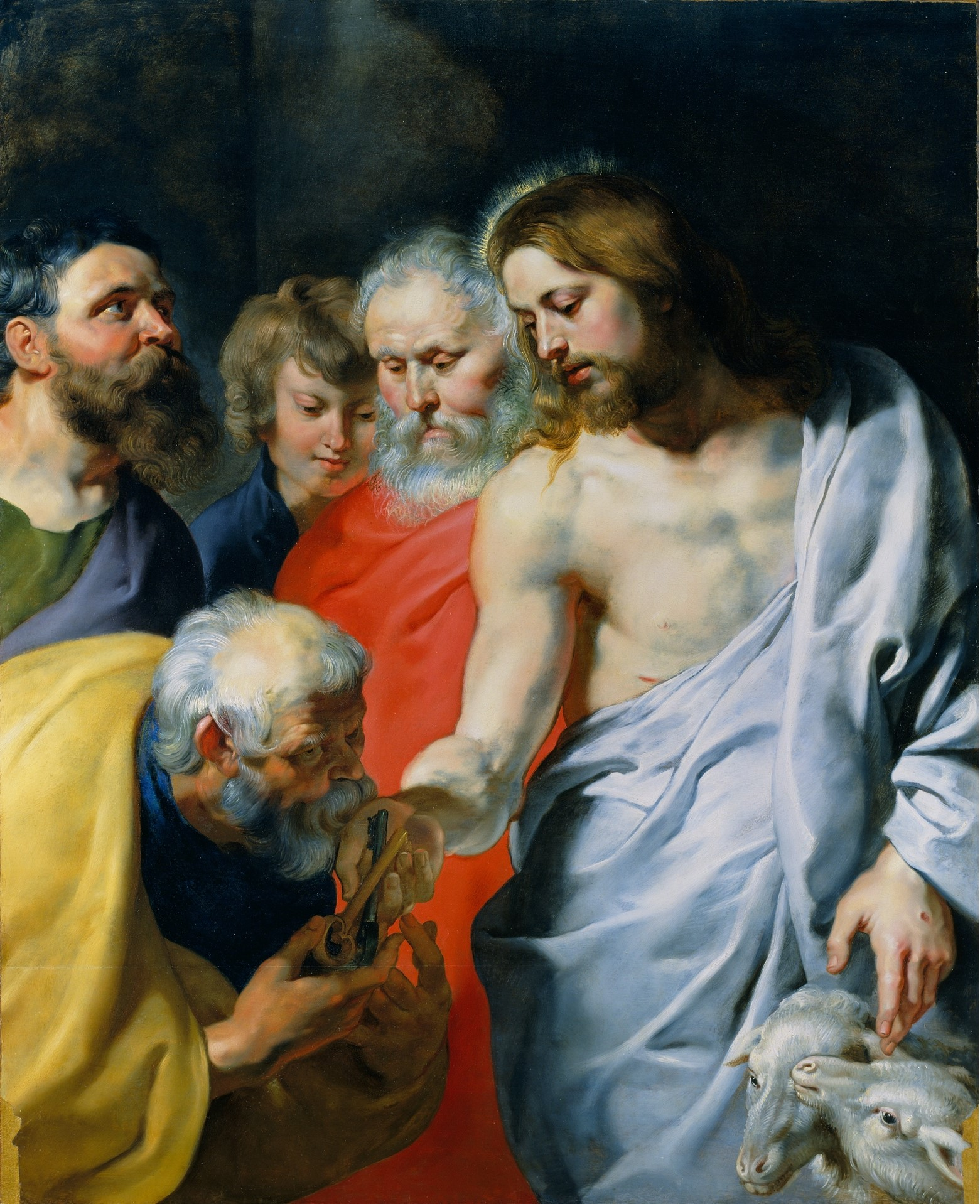
Peter Paul Rubens – Christ's Charge to Peter, c. 1616

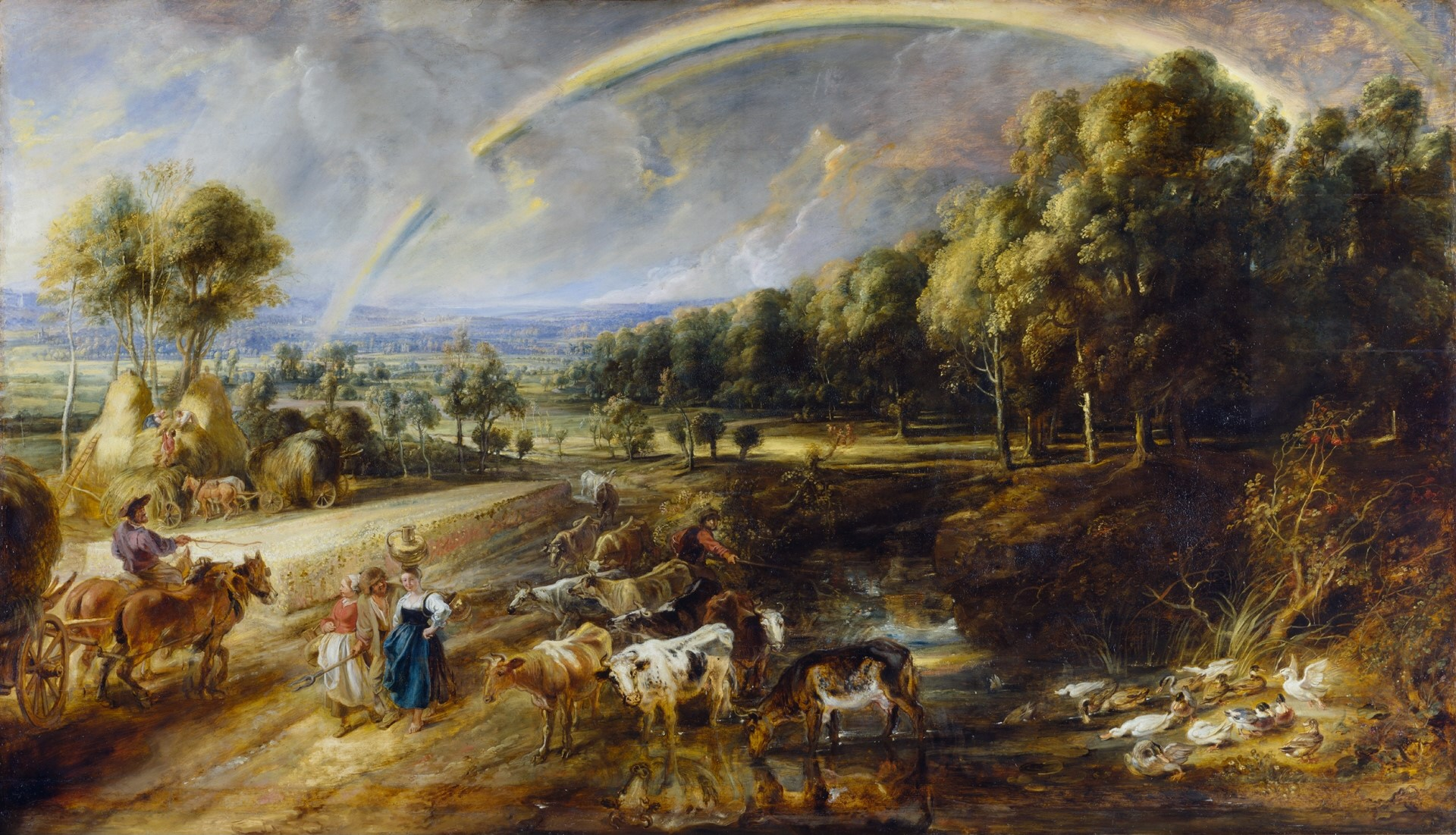
Peter Paul Rubens – Landscape with a Rainbow, c. 1638

French School:

- François Boucher – 17 paintings (one of the largest holdings of his works in the world)
- Philippe de Champaigne – 4 paintings
- Jean-Baptiste-Camille Corot – 1 painting
- Eugène Delacroix – 2 paintings including The Execution of the Doge Marino Faliero
- Hippolyte Delaroche – 12 paintings
- Gaspard Dughet – 1 painting
- Jean-Honoré Fragonard – 8 paintings including his masterpiece, The Swing
- Théodore Géricault – 2 paintings
- Jean-Baptiste Greuze – 19 paintings
- Nicolas Lancret – 11 paintings
- François Lemoyne – 2 paintings
- Claude Lorrain – 1 painting
- Jean-Marc Nattier – 3 paintings
- Jean-Baptiste Oudry – 7 paintings
- Jean-Baptiste Pater – 13 paintings
- Nicolas Poussin – 1 painting
- Jean-François de Troy – 2 paintings
- Claude-Joseph Vernet – 2 paintings
- Horace Vernet – 30 paintings
- Jean-Antoine Watteau – 8 paintings (the 3rd largest holdings in the world)

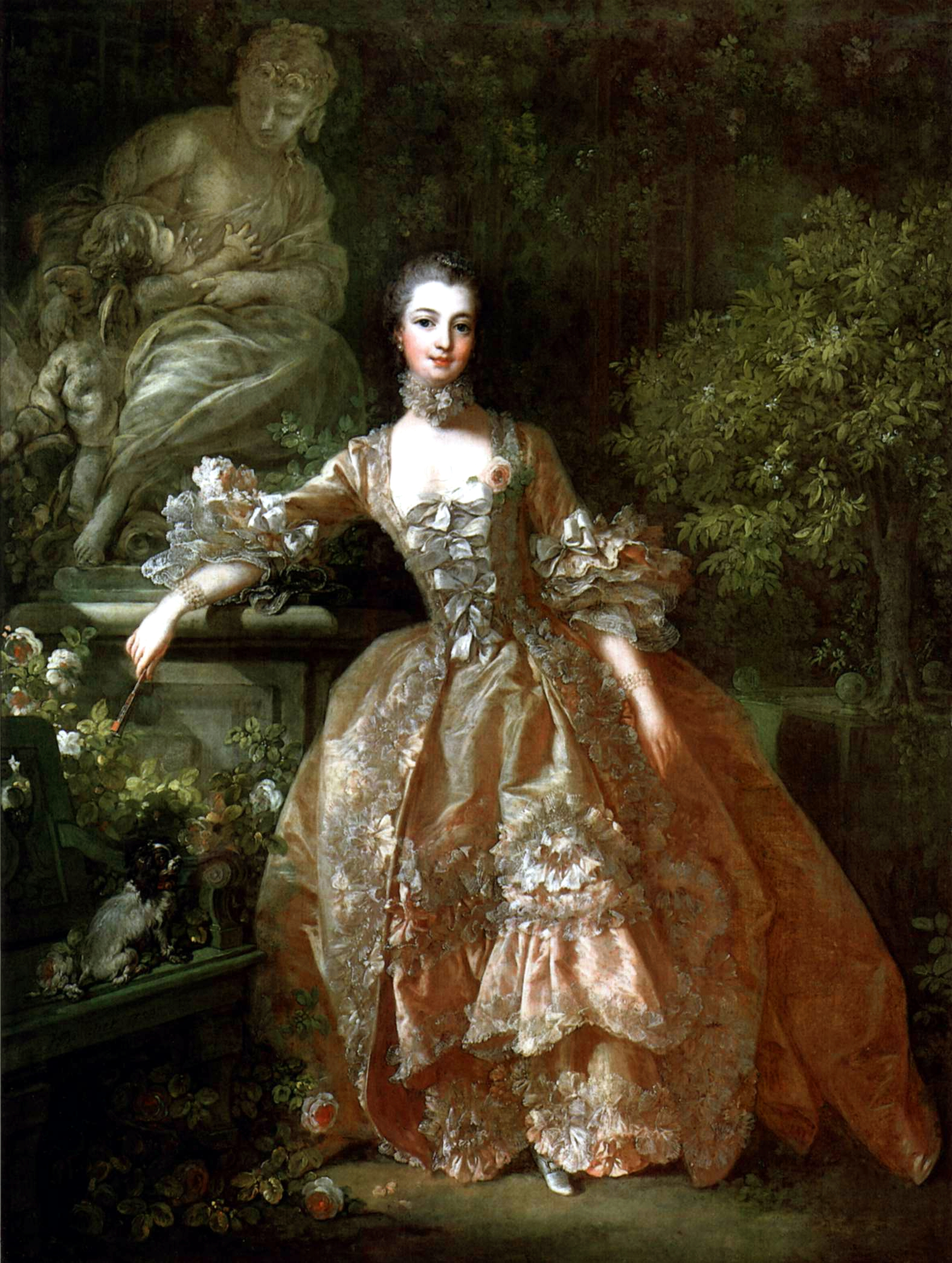
François Boucher – Madame de Pompadour, 1759

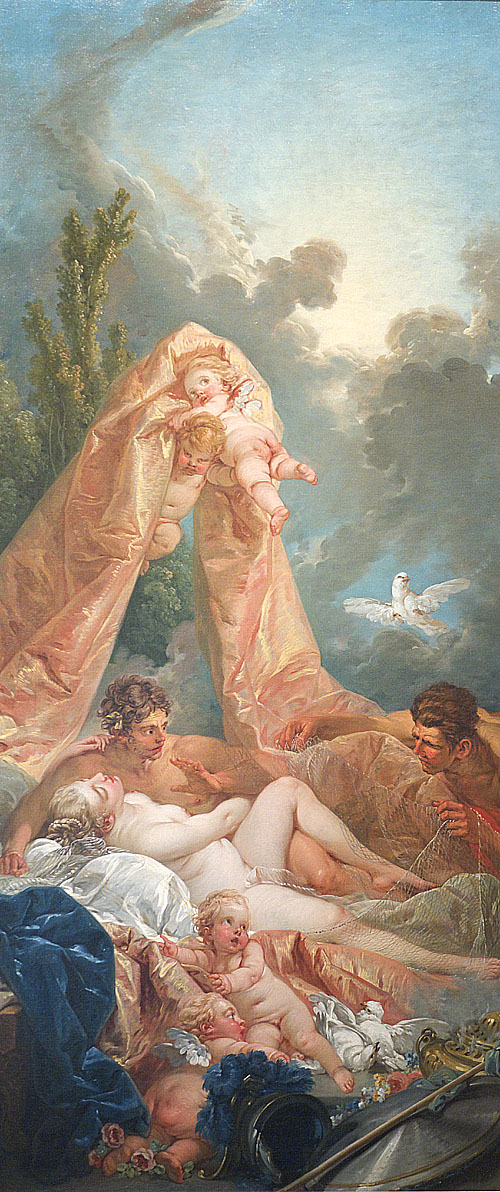
François Boucher – Mars and Venus

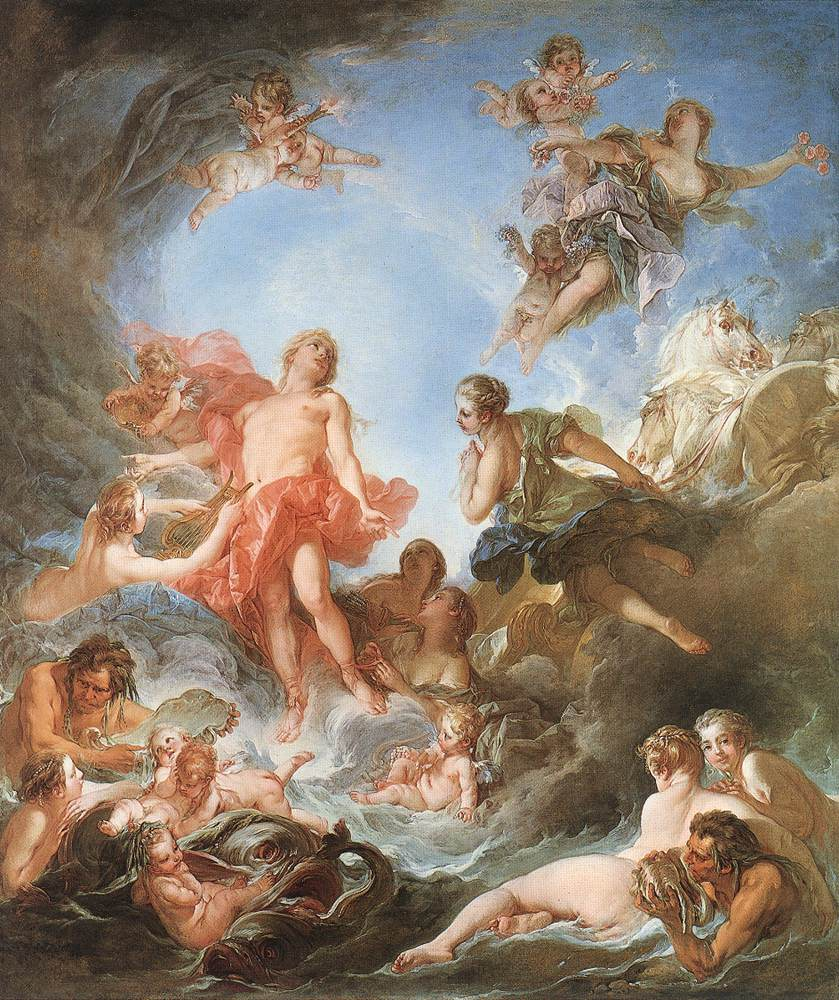
François Boucher – The Rising of the Sun, 1753

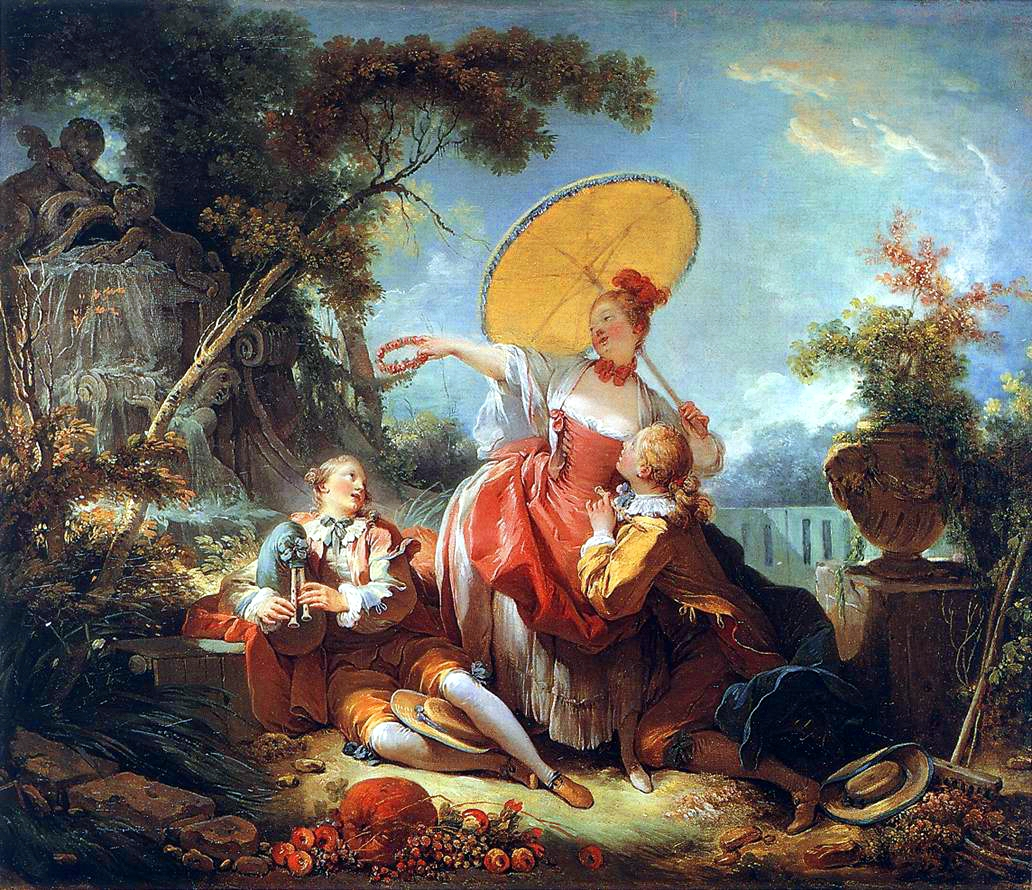
Jean-Honoré Fragonard – The Musical Contest, 1754–55

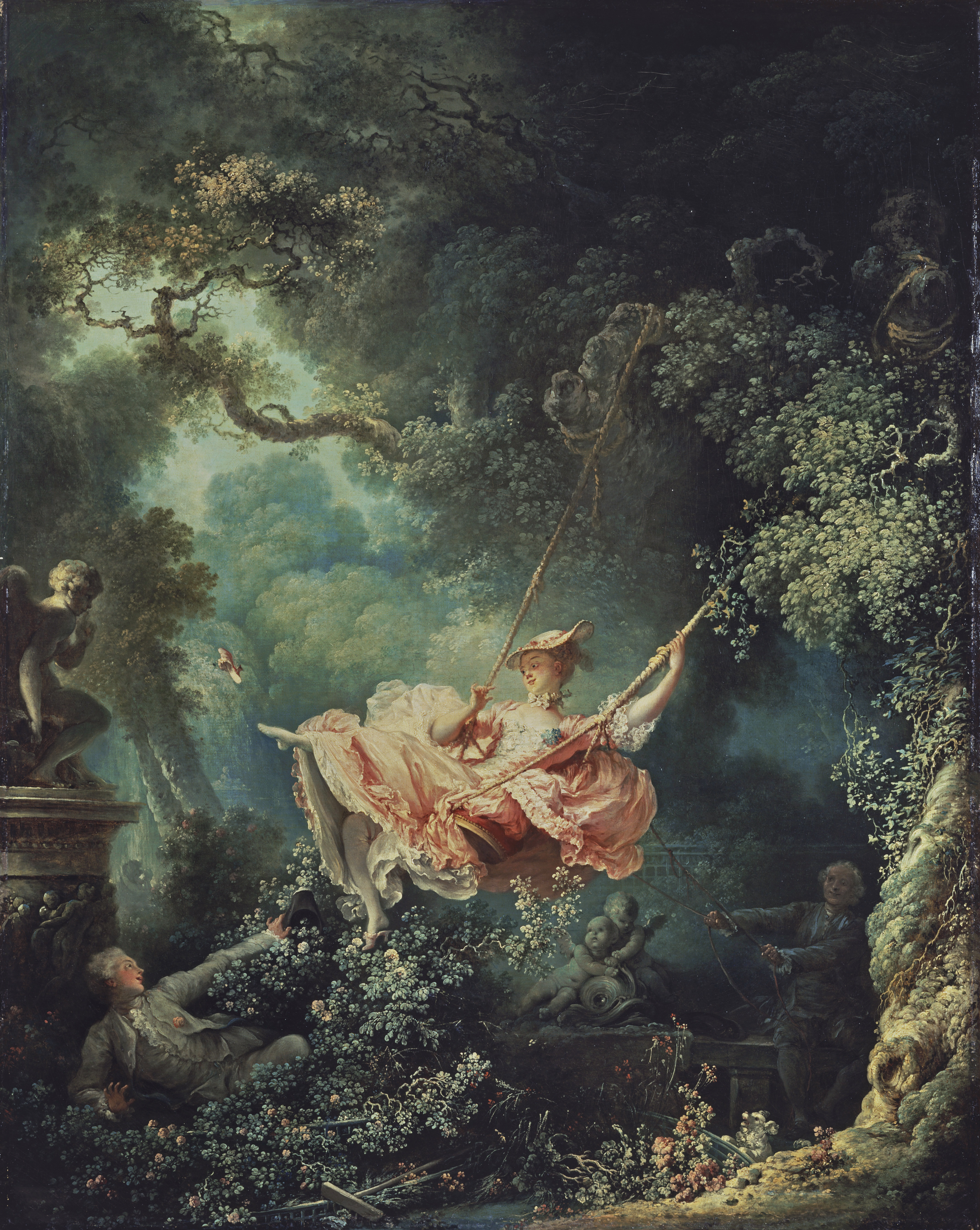
Jean-Honoré Fragonard – The Swing, 1767

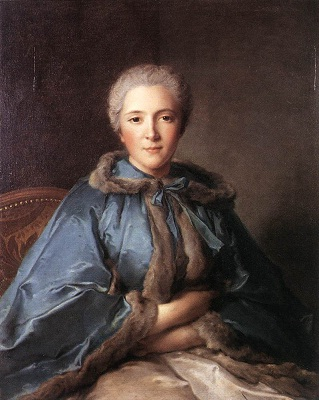
Jean-Marc Nattier – The Comtesse de Tillières, 1750

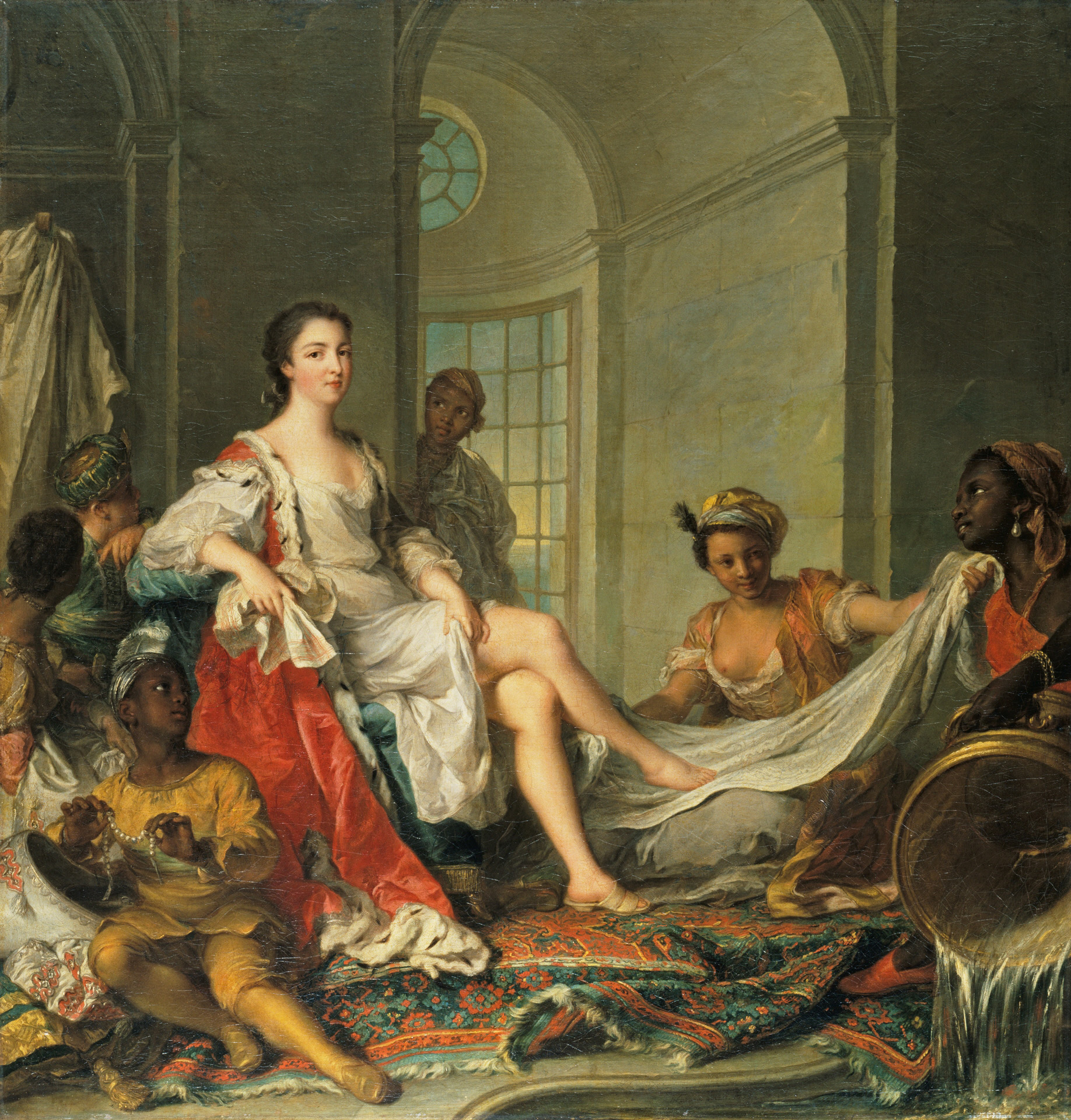
Jean-Marc Nattier – Mademoiselle de Clermont as a Sultana, 1733

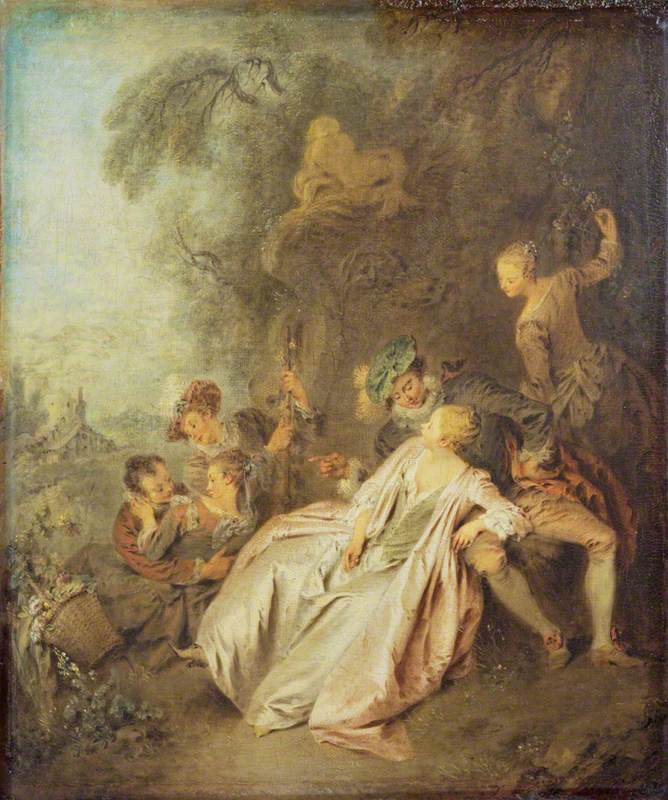
Jean-Baptiste Pater - A Gallant Conversation, 1729

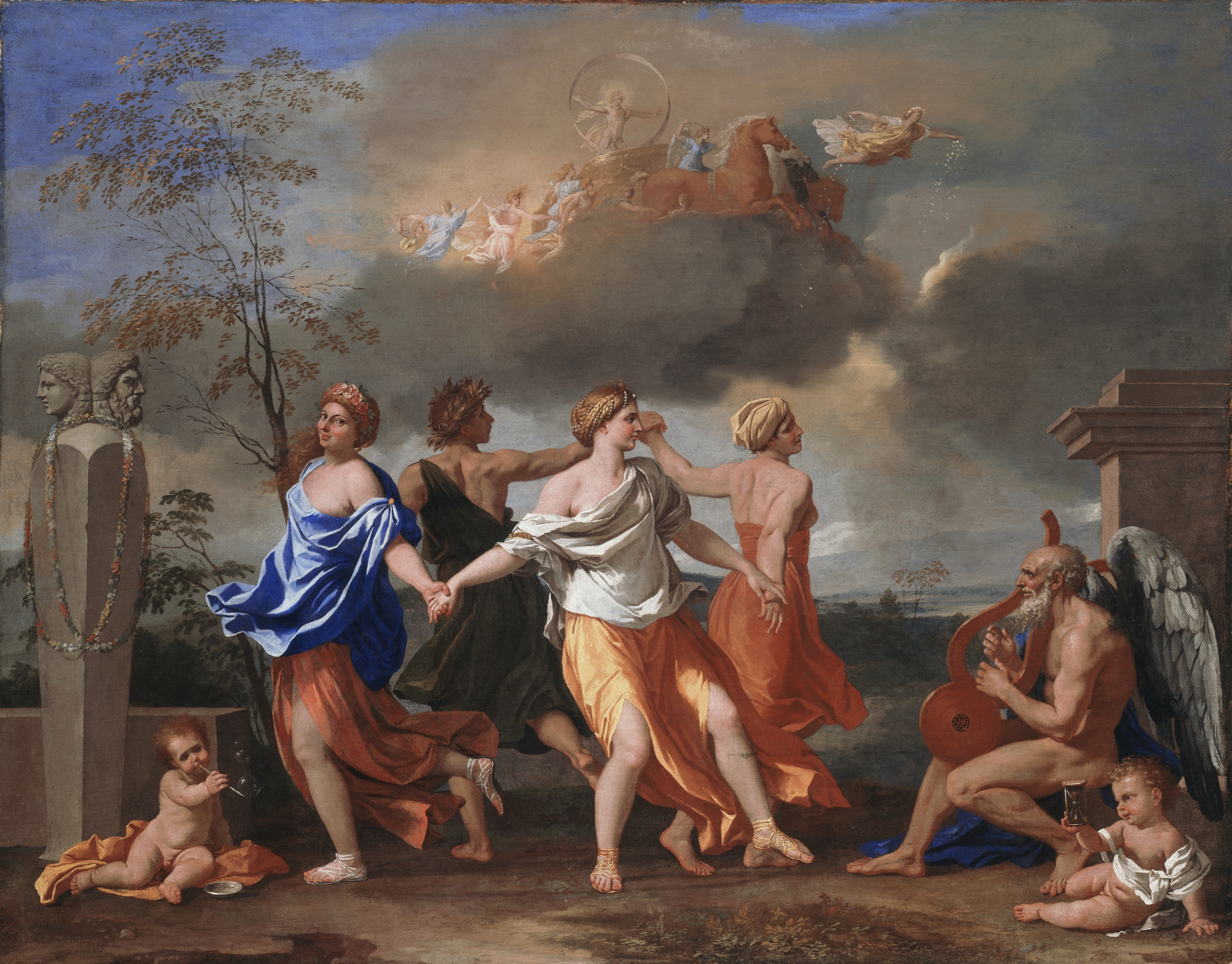
Nicolas Poussin – A Dance to the Music of Time, c. 1634–1636

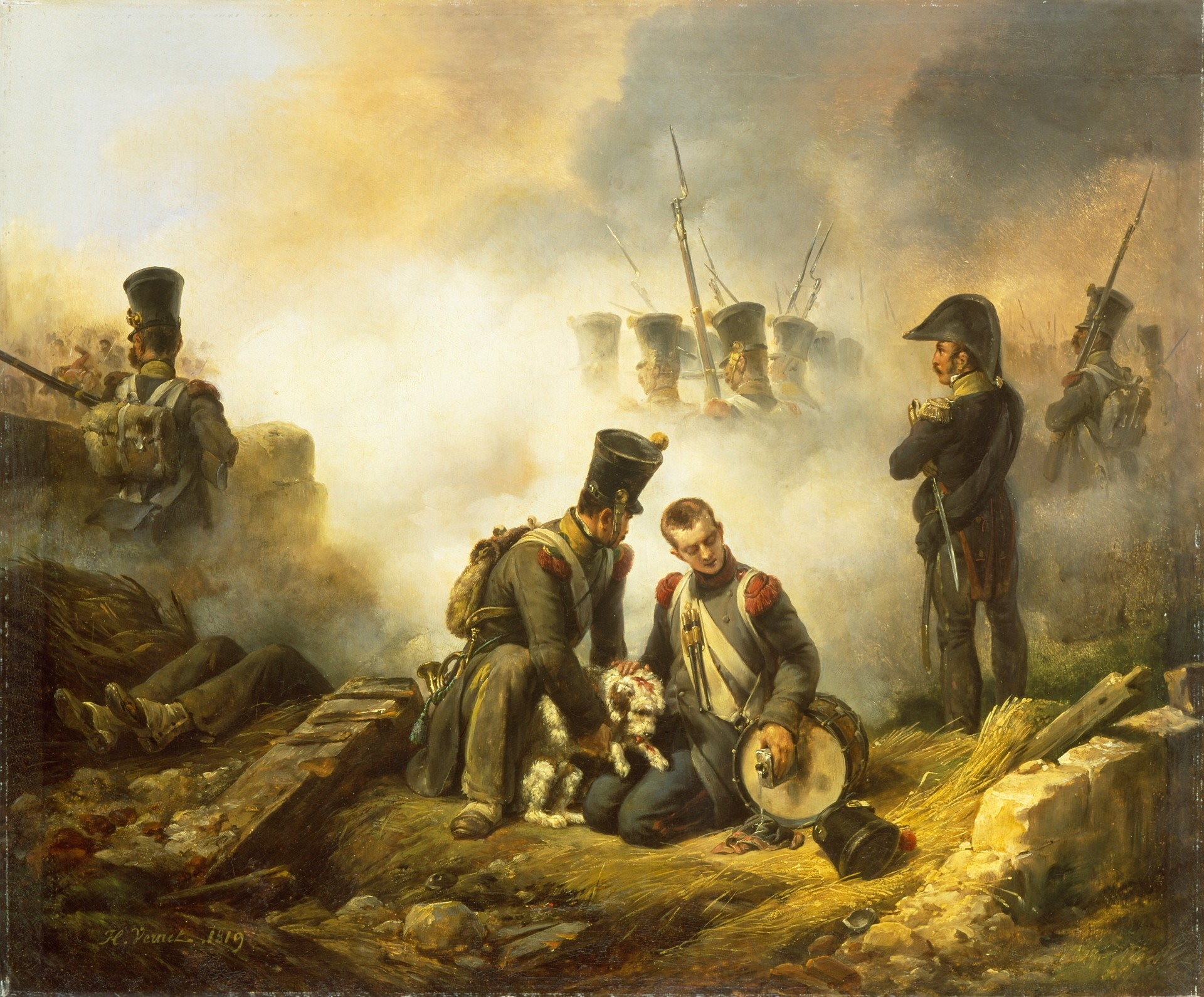
Horace Vernet – The Dog of the Regiment Wounded, (1819)

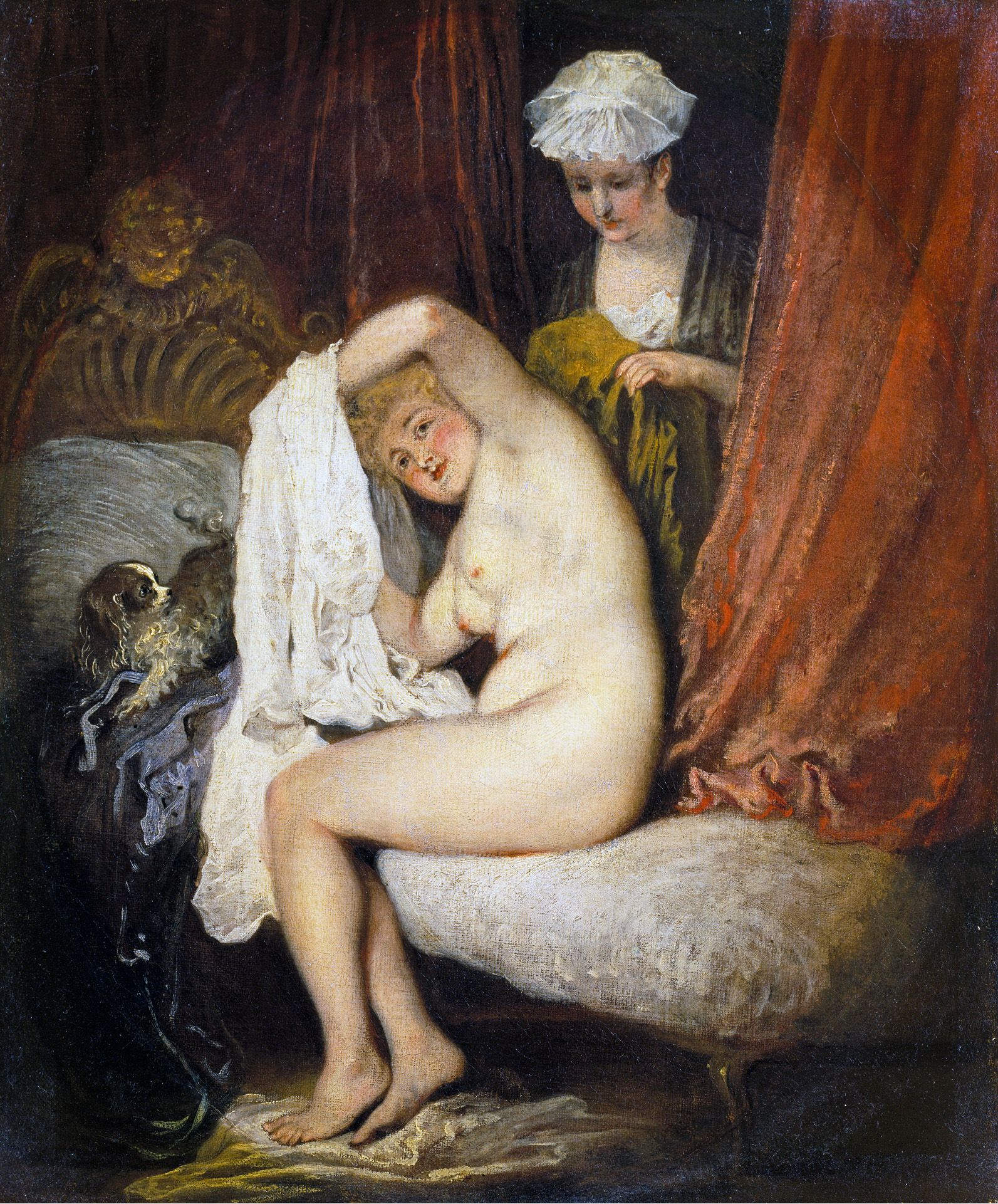
Jean-Antoine Watteau – A Lady at her Toilet, c. 1716–18)

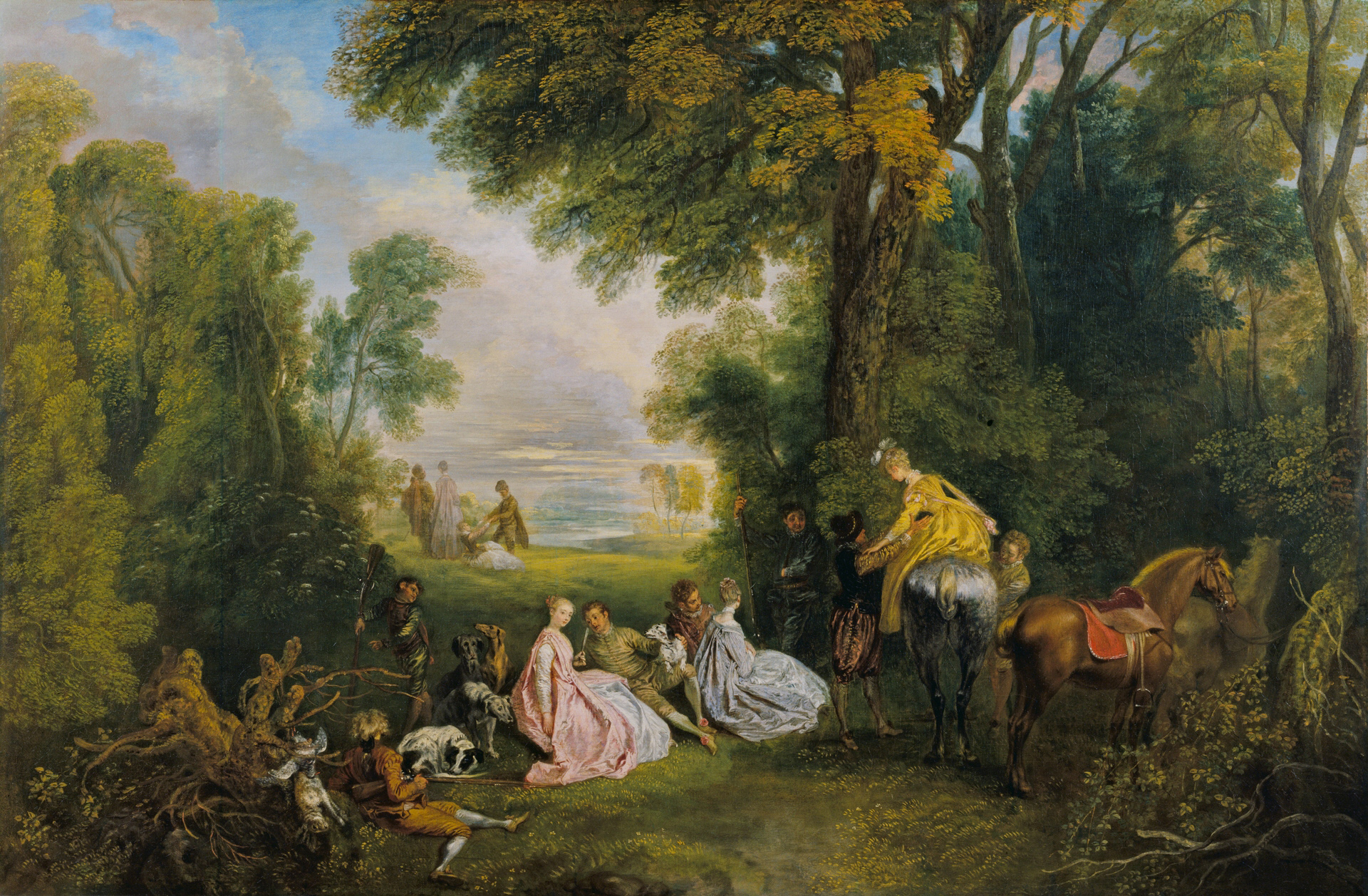
Jean-Antoine Watteau – The Halt during the Chase, c. 1718–1720

Italian School

- Francesco Albani – 1 painting
- Canaletto, (Giovanni Antonio Canal) – 8 paintings
- Giovanni Battista Cima da Conegliano – 2 paintings
- Carlo Crivelli – 1 painting
- (Domenichino) – 1 painting
- Francesco Guardi – 9 paintings
- Bernardino Luini – 4 paintings
- Salvator Rosa – 1 painting (one of the finest Rosas in existence)
- Andrea del Sarto – 1 painting
- Titian (Tiziano Vecelli) – 2 paintings including one of the six Poise's commissioned on Philip II of Spain
- Sassoferrato – 3 paintings

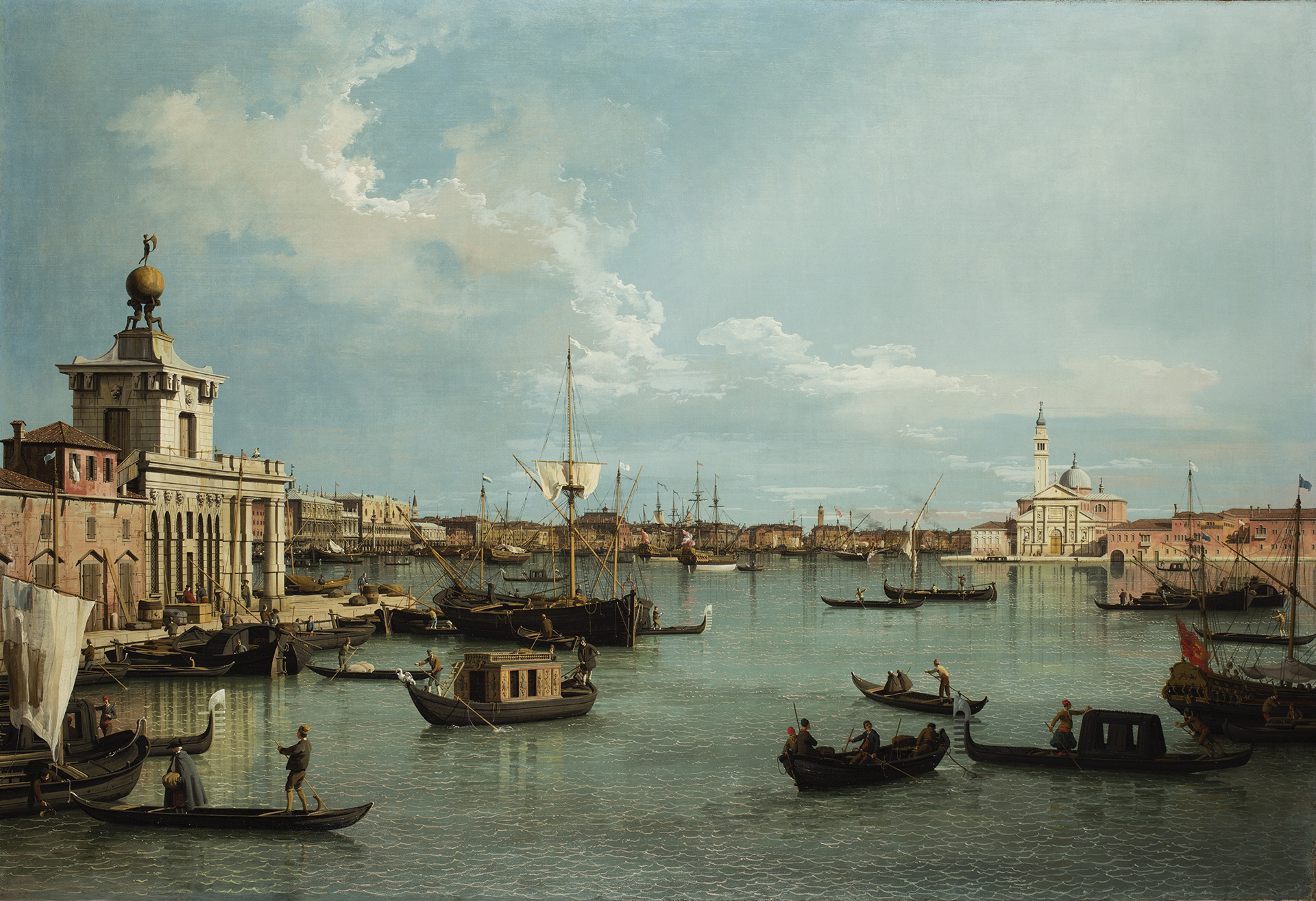
Canaletto (Giovanni Antonio Canal) – The Bacino from the Giudecca, Venice, c. 1740

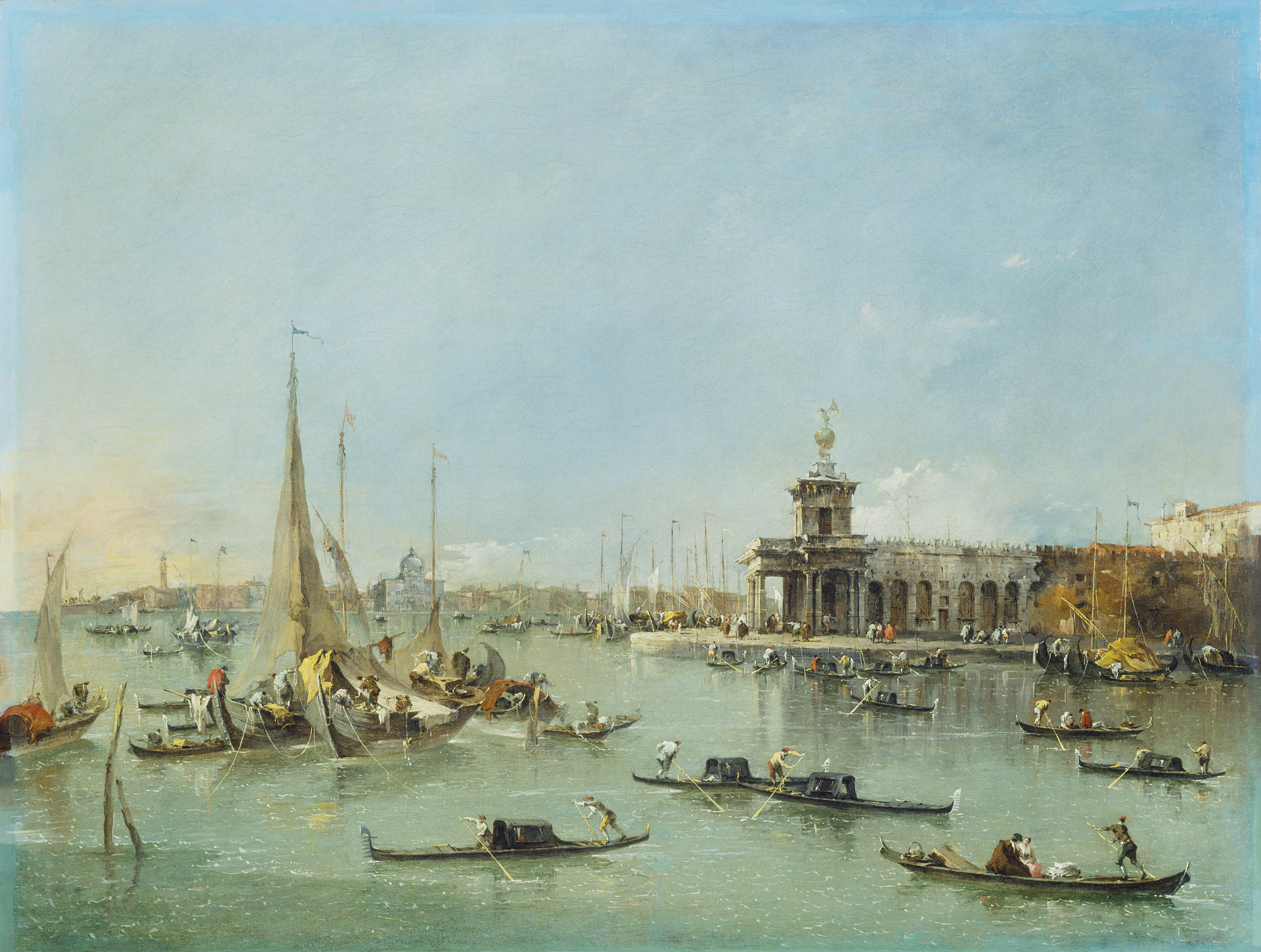
Francesco Guardi – The Dogana with the Giudecca, c. 1775

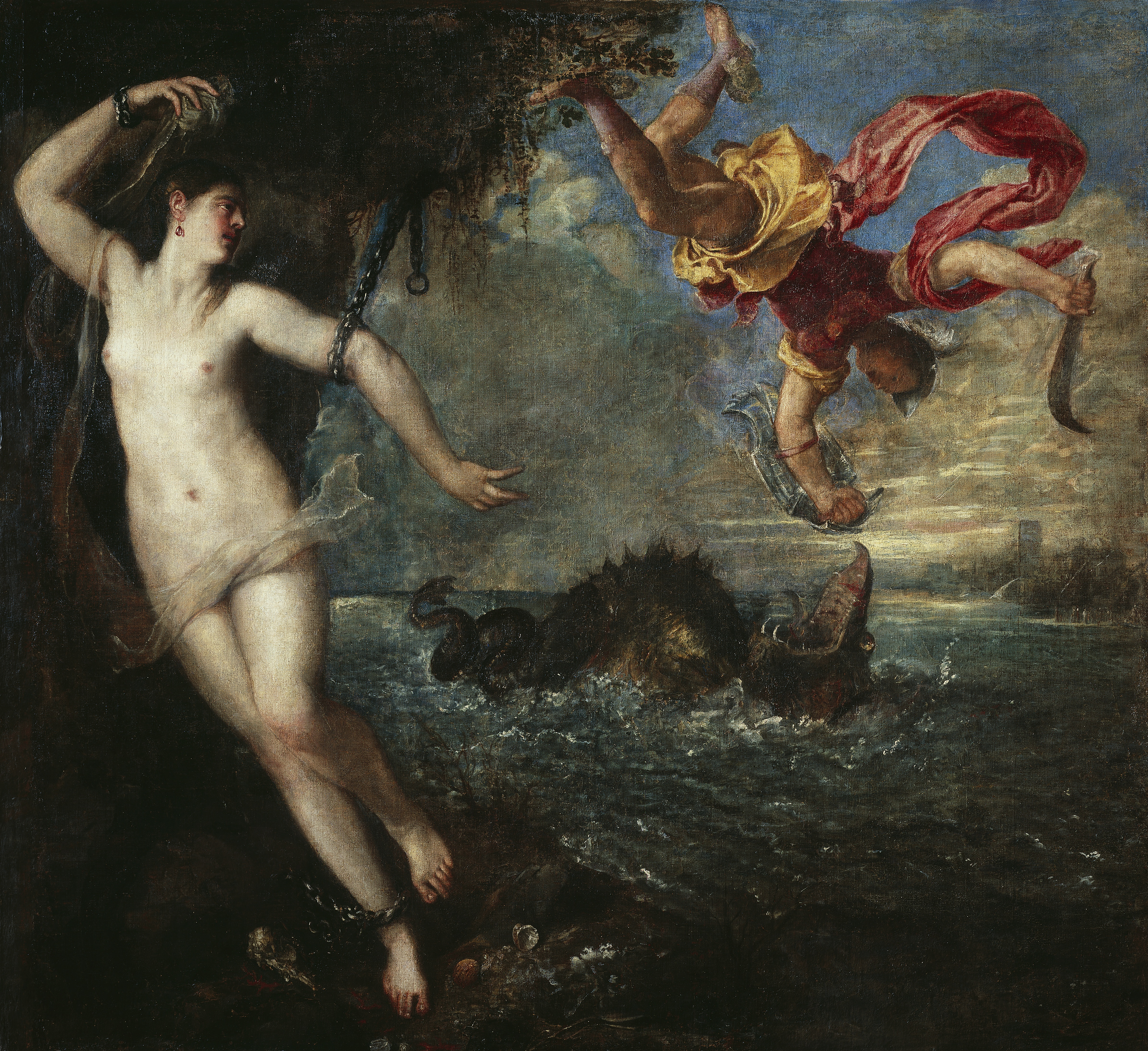
Titian – Perseus and Andromeda, c. 1554–1556

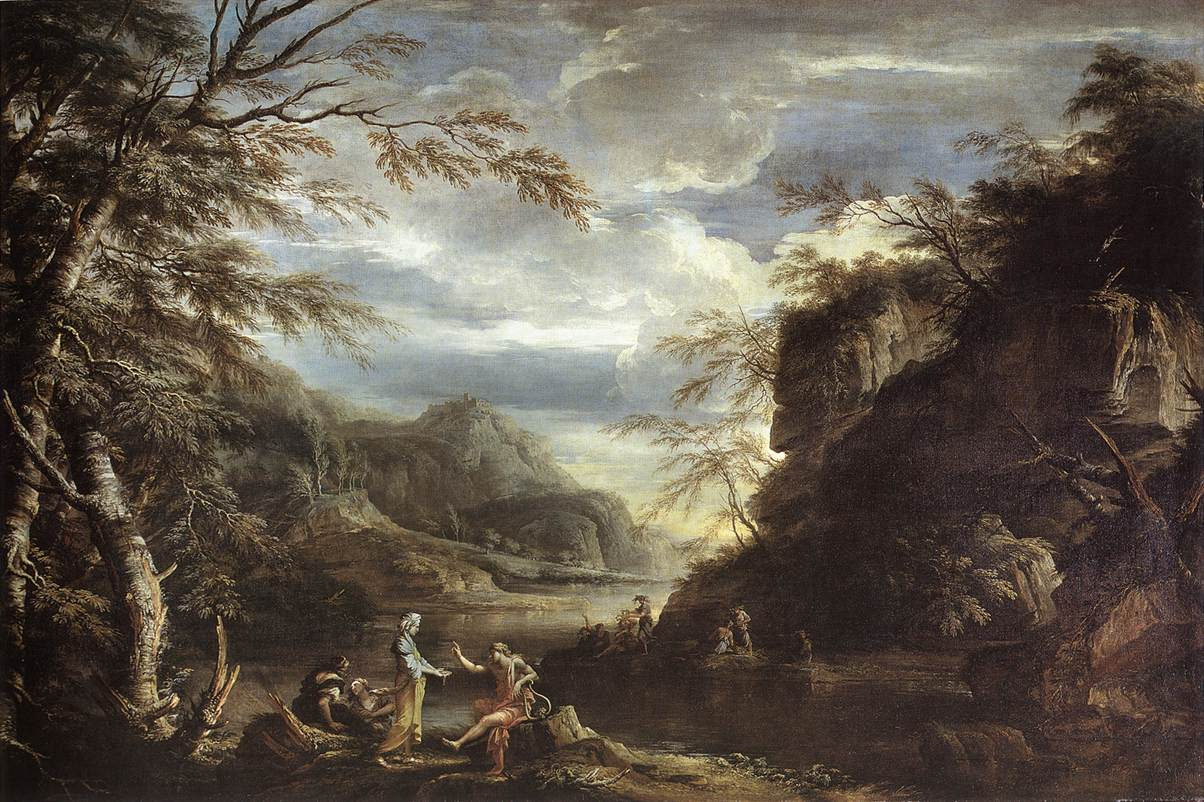
Salvator Rosa –- River Landscape with Apollo and the Cumean Sibyl

Spanish School

- Alonso Cano – 1 painting
- Bartolomé Esteban Murillo – 9 paintings (one of the largest holdings of his works in the world)
- Diego Velázquez – 2 paintings including Lady with a Fan, one of the artist's greatest paintings

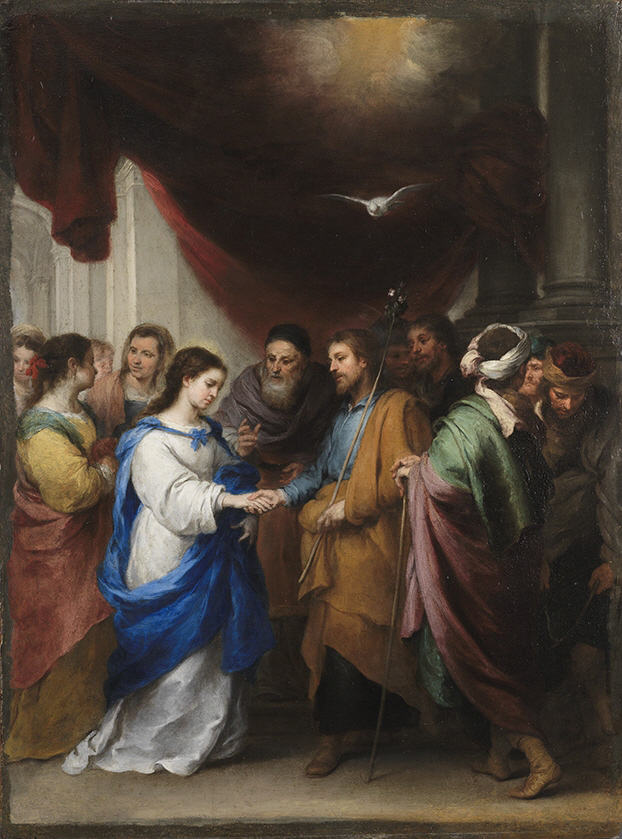
Bartolomé Esteban Murillo – Marriage of the Virgin, 1670

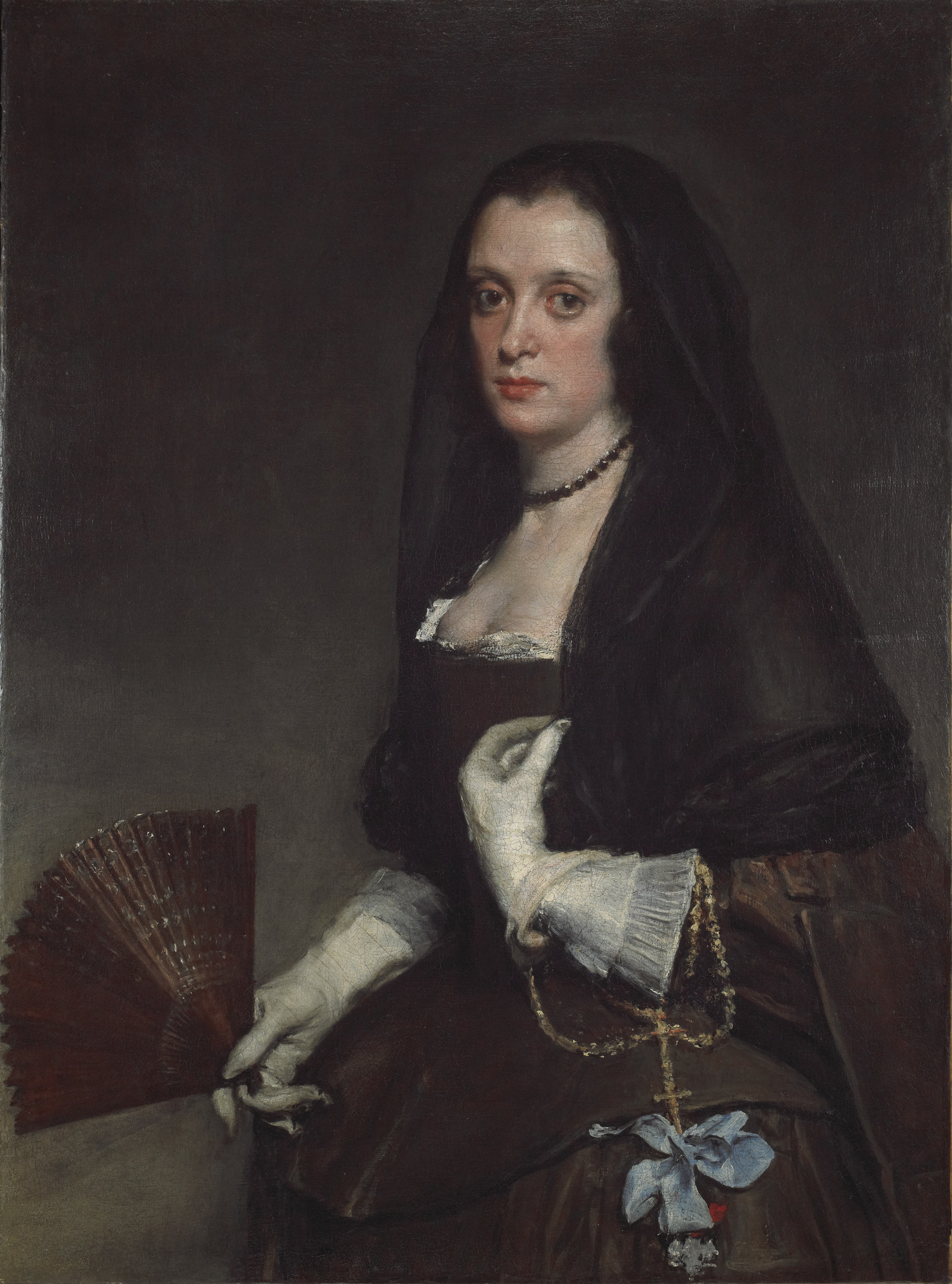
Diego Velázquez – Lady with a Fan, c. 1638–39

=== Ceramics ===
There are fine examples of porcelain on display, including Meissen porcelain, and one of the world's major collections of 18th-century Sèvres porcelain. It includes 137 vases, 80 tea wares, 67 useful wares, 3 biscuit figures and 130 plaques (mostly on furniture), and was acquired by the Marquesses of Hertford and Sir Richard Wallace between c. 1802–75.

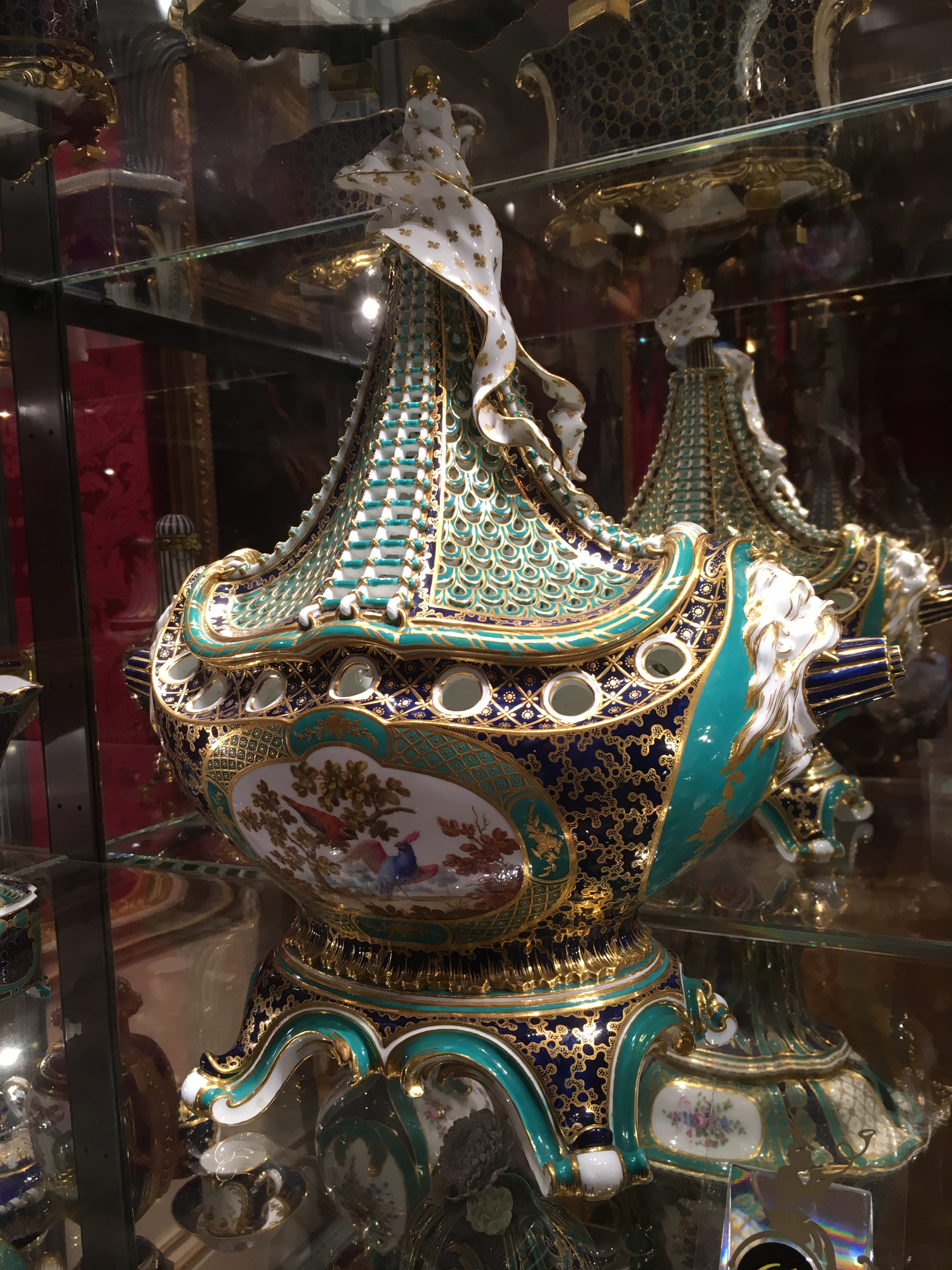
Sèvres pot-pourri vase in the shape of a ship, one of the rarest, largest and most elaborate vases ever produced by Sèvres

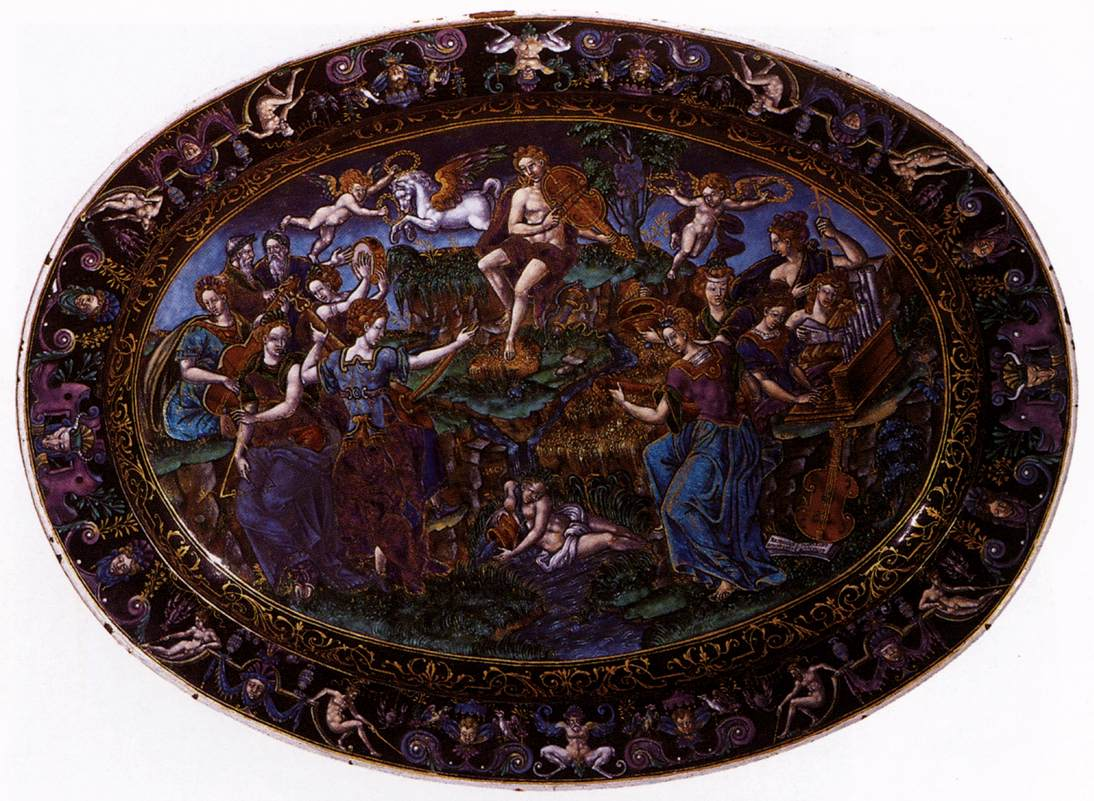
Renaissance Limoges enamel dish by Martial Courtois

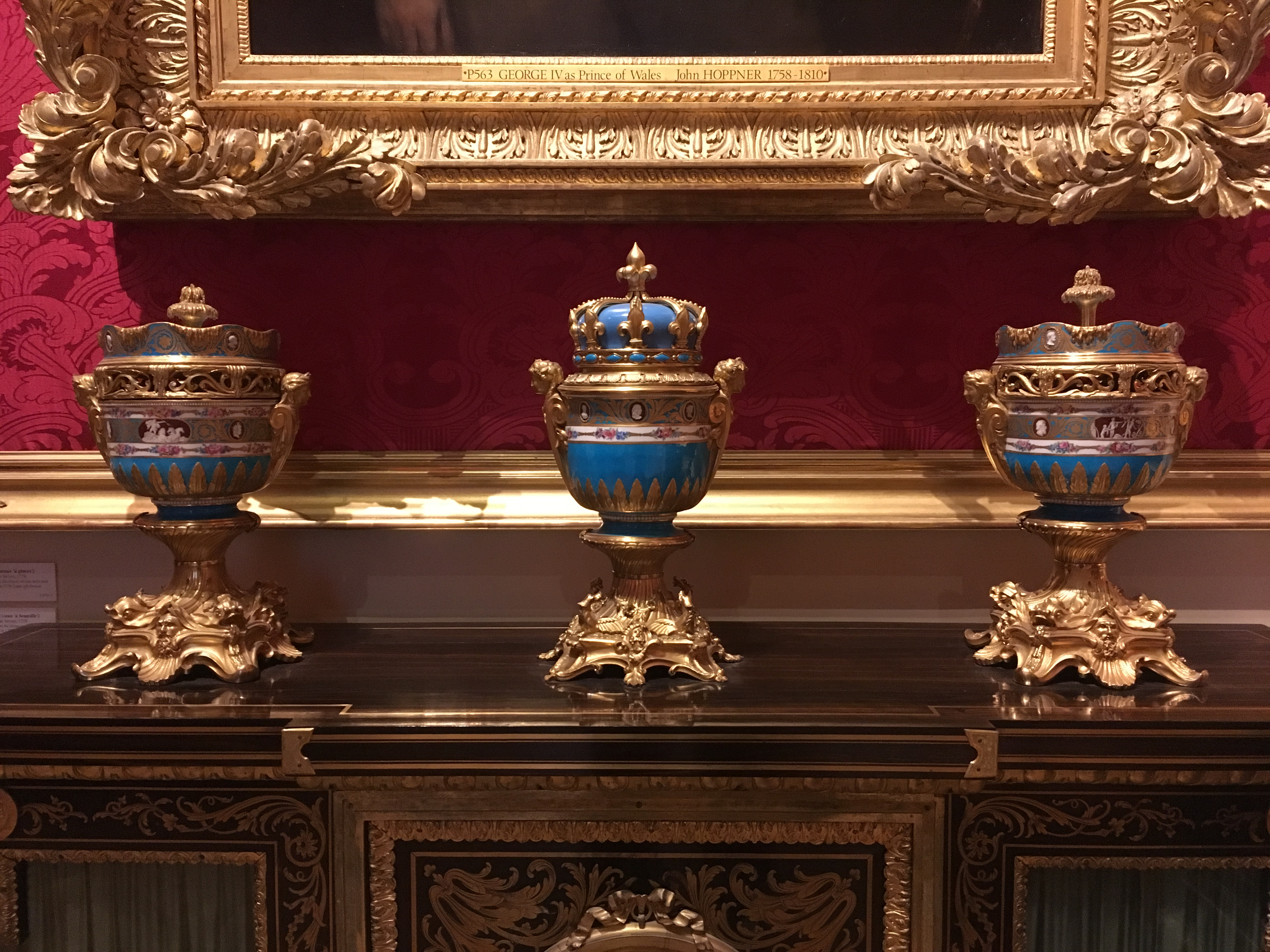
Sèvres – Three rare pieces from the celebrated collection of Catherine the Great, Empress of Russia

=== Arms and armour ===
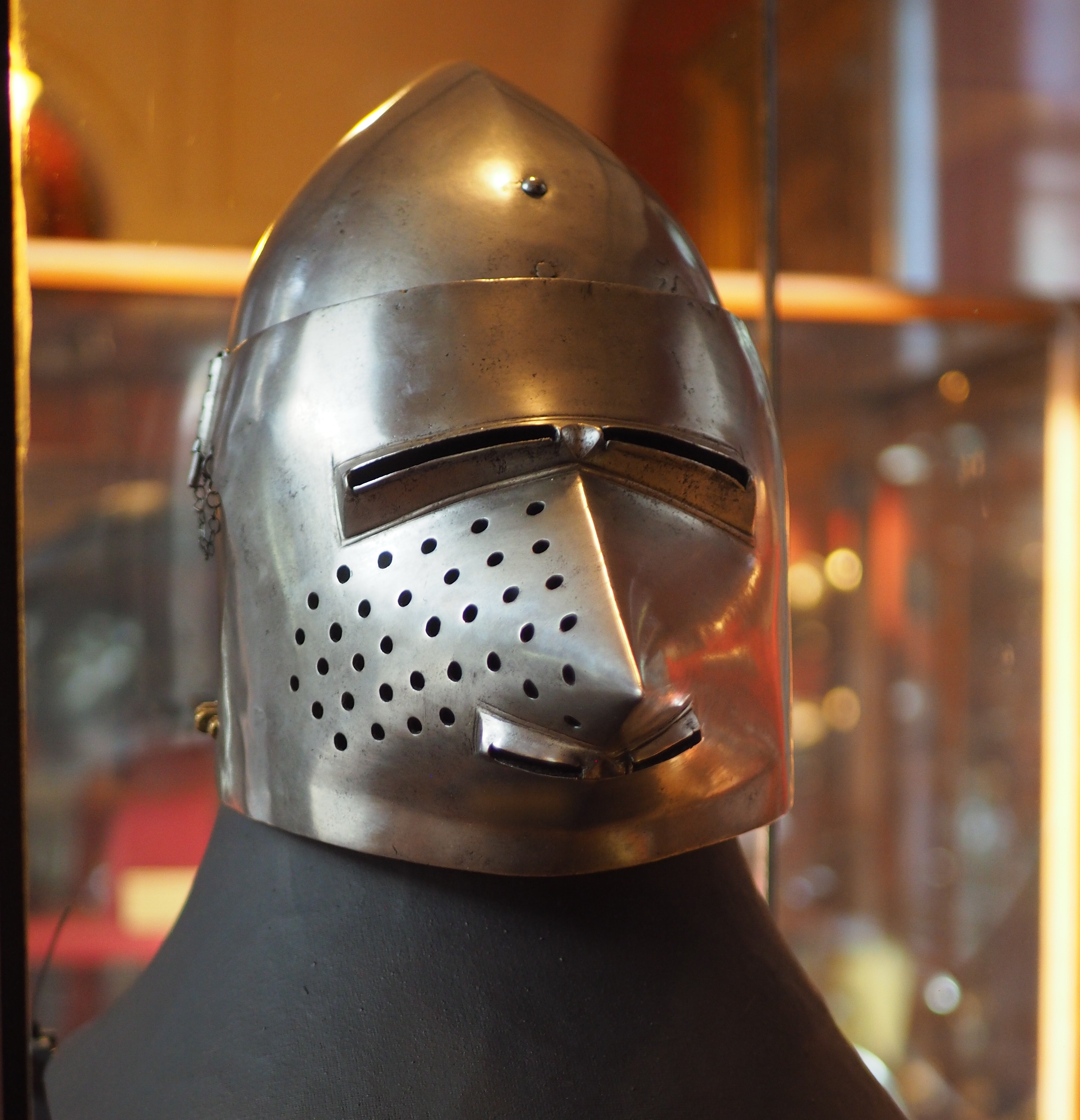
Visored Bascinet, probably French, c. 1390-1410

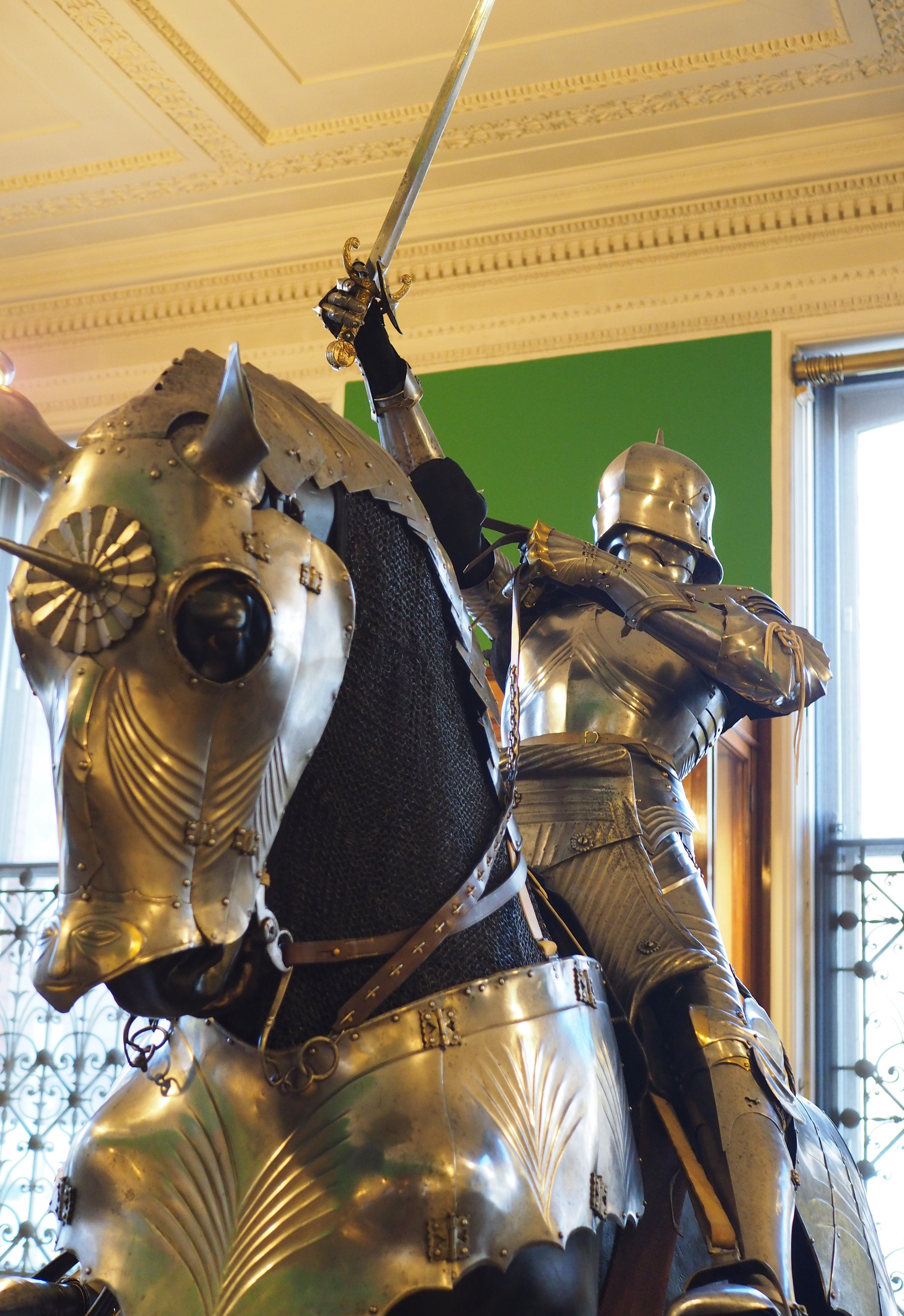
Armour for Man and Horse, Landshut, c. 1480

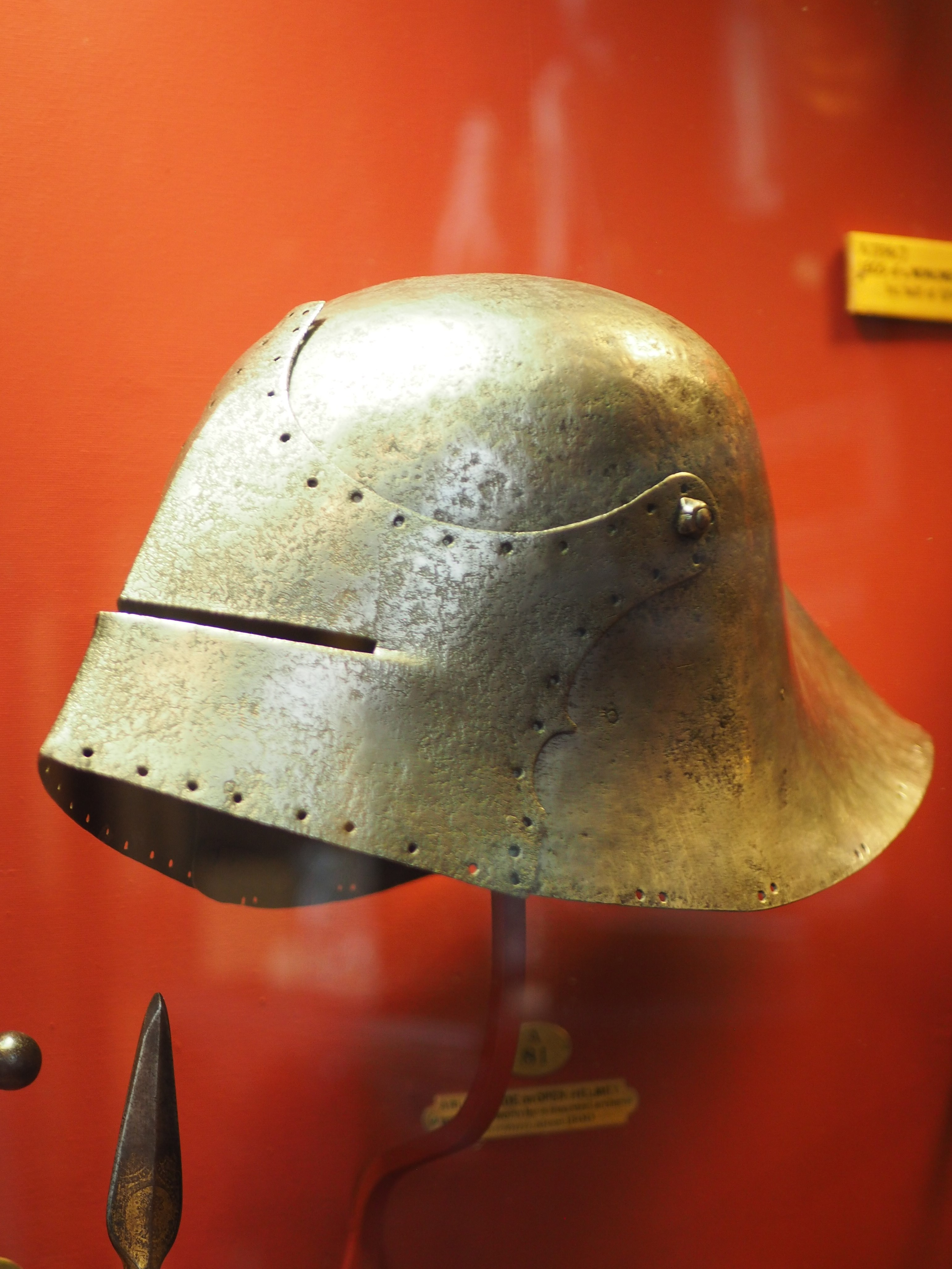
Sallet, Unknown Artist / Maker Germany Date: c. 1490

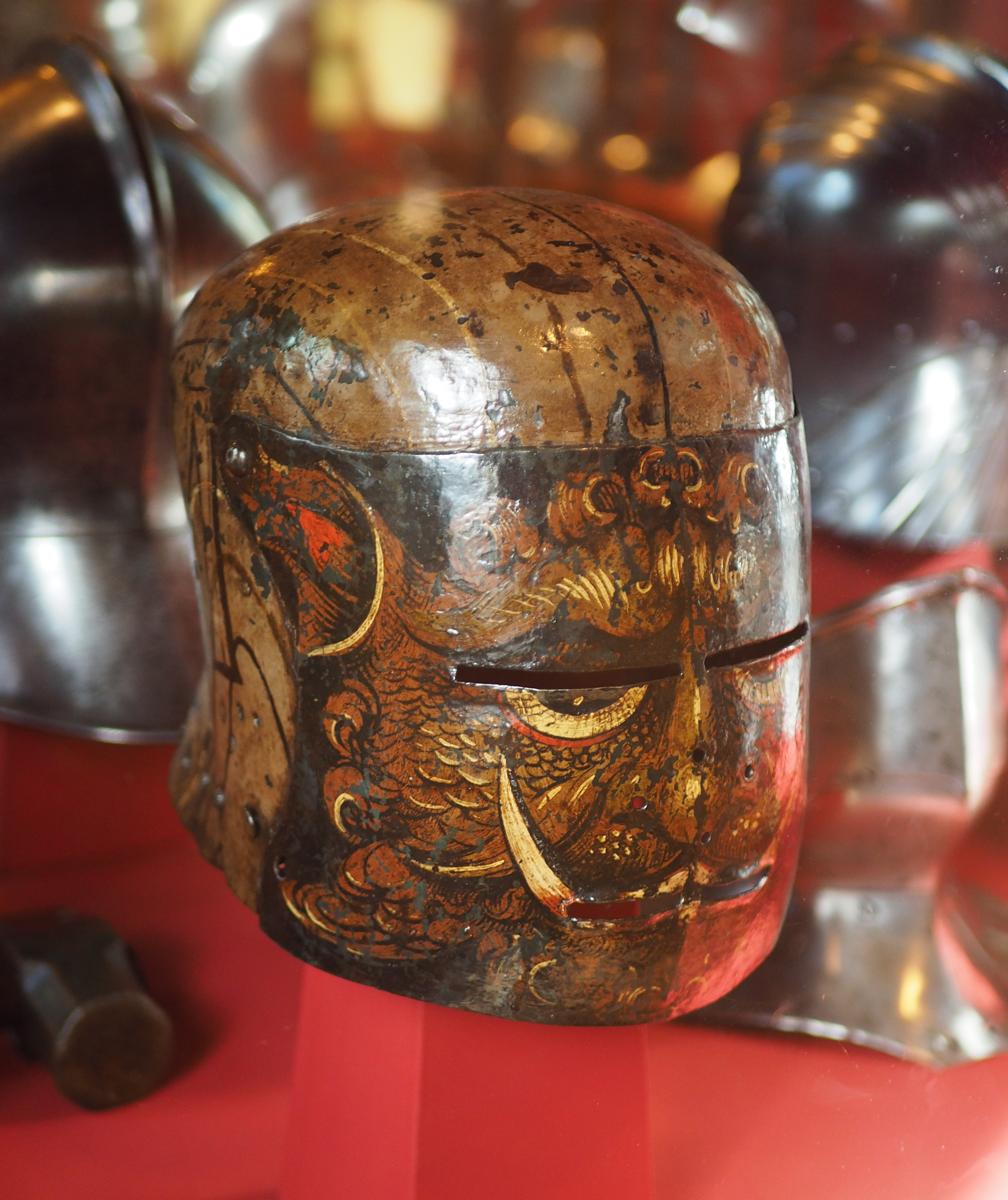
Painted Sallet depicting a mythical beast, c. 1500

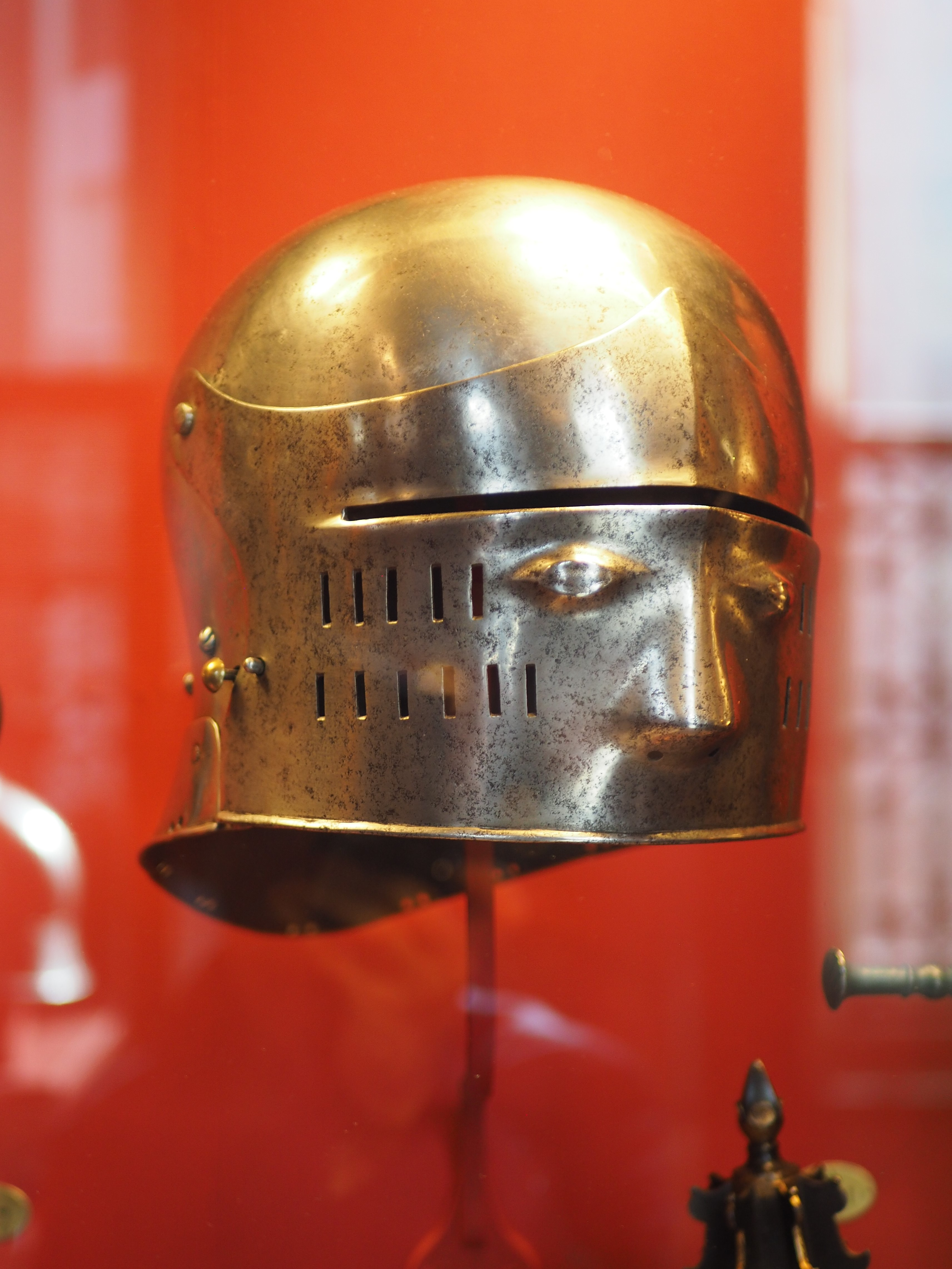
Sallet, Unknown Artist / Maker Germany Date: c. 1510

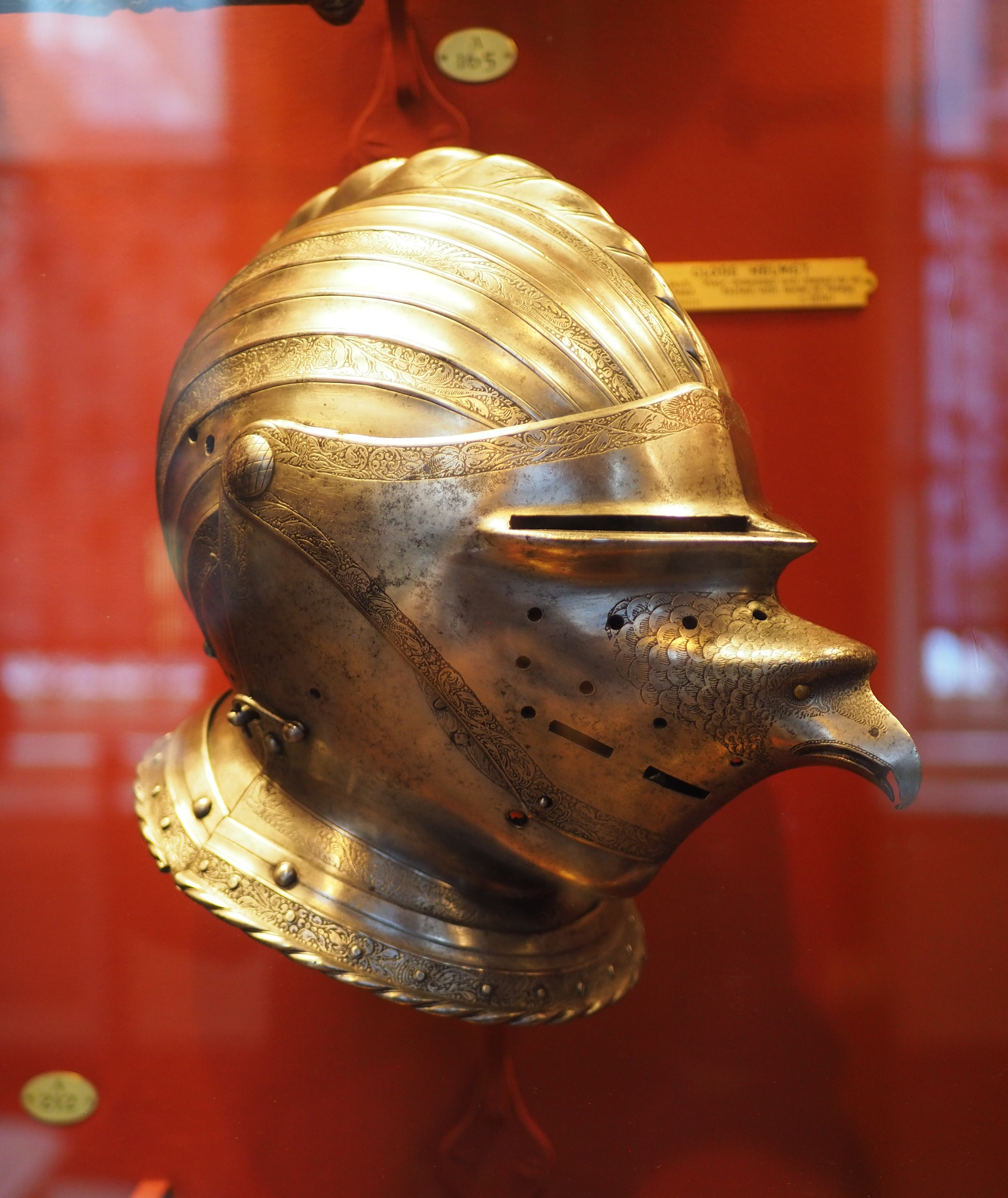
Close-helmet, Unknown Artist / Maker Nuremberg, Germany Date: c. 1530

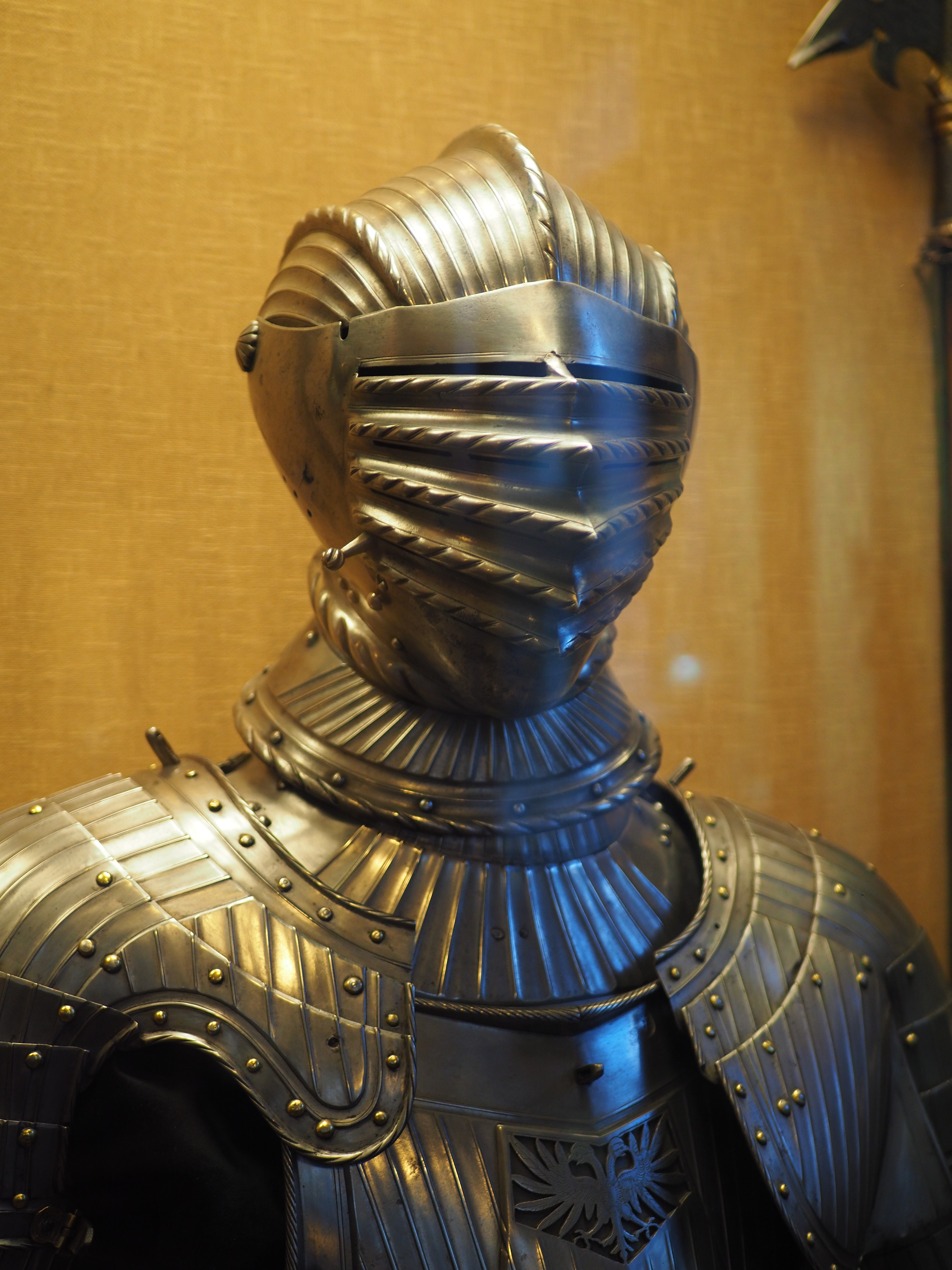
Fluted Armour in the Maximilian Style, c. 1612 and 19th century

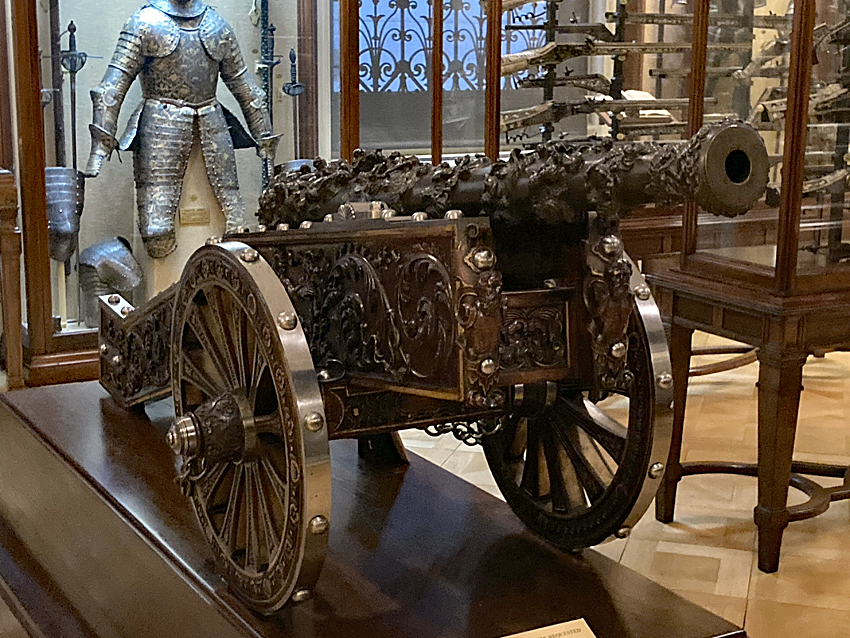
17th century Venetian ceremonial cannon

=== Furniture ===
The Wallace Collection holds one of the most important collections of French furniture in the UK, and ranks alongside the Musée du Louvre, the Royal Collection, Waddesdon Manor, the collections of the Duke of Buccleuch, the Getty Museum and the Metropolitan Museum of Art as one of the greatest and most celebrated in the world. Totalling more than five hundred pieces, the collection consists largely of 18th-century French furniture but also includes some significant pieces of 19th-century French furniture, as well as interesting Italian furniture and a few English and German pieces. The collection ranges from cabinet furniture, much of which is veneered with brass and turtleshell marquetry (commonly known as "Boulle" marquetry) or with wood marquetry, to seat furniture, clocks and barometers, gilt-bronze items including mounted porcelain and hardstones, mantelpieces, mirrors, boxes and pedestals. One highlight is the major collection of furniture attributed to André-Charles Boulle. (1642–1732).

Joseph Baumhauer – 1 item:

- Bas d'armoire, c. 1765–1770

André-Charles Boulle – 22 items:

- Armoire, c. 1695;
- Armoire, c. 1700;
- Armoire, c. 1700;
- Armoire, c. 1715;
- Bureau plat, c. 1700–1710;
- Cabinet avec son pied, c. 1667;
- Cartonnier et pendule, c. 1715;
- Commode, c. 1710;
- Paire de grande table, c. 1705;
- Mantle clock, c. 1715;
- Mantle clock, c. 1726;
- Médaillier, c. 1710–1720;
- Miroir de toilette, c. 1713, (delivered to the Duchess of Berry);
- Paire de coffre de toilette, c. 1700;
- Paire de torchéres, c. 1700–1710;
- Pendule et gaine, c. 1712–1720;
- Pendule et gaine, c. 1720–1725;
- Table à mettre dans un trumeau, c. 1705;

Martin Carlin – 4 items:

- Paire de Encoignures, c. 1772;
- Secrétaire à abattant, c. 1775;
- Table en secrétaire, c. 1783;

Adrien Delorme – 2 items:

- Paire de bibliothèque basse

Étienne Doirat – 1 item:

- Commode, c. 1720;

Étienne Levasseur – 5 items;

- Grande Bibliothèque, c. 1775;
- Paire de bibliothèque basse, c. 1775
- Paire de meubles à hauteur de'appui, c. 1775

Alexandre-Jean Oppenord – 3 items:

- Bureau plat, 1710;
- Commode, c. 1695;
- Écritoire, c. 1710;

Jean Henri Riesener – 10 items:

- Commode, delivered to Marie Antoinette's cabinet intérieur de la reine at Versailles, c. 1780;
- Commode, delivered to Marie Antoinette for Chateau de Marly, c. 1782;
- Encoignure, delivered to Marie Antoinette's cabinet intérieur at Versailles, c. 1783;
- Secrétaire à abattant, delivered to Marie Antoinette's cabinet intérieur at Versailles, c. 1783;
- Secrétaire à abattant, delivered to Marie Antoinette's Petit Triannon at Versailles, c. 1783;
- Secrétaire à abattant, delivered to Marie Antoinette's cabinet intérieur at Versailles, c. 1780;
- Bureau à cylindre, delivered to the Count d'Orsay for the Hôtel d'Orsay, c. 1774;
- Bureau à cylindre, c. 1785;
- Secrétaire à abattant, c. 1780–1784;
- Table de toilette, c. 1780–1784;

Bernard I van Risamburgh – 1 item:

- Bureau plat, c. 1719

Nicolas Sageot – 2 items:

- Commode, c.1700;
- Commode, c.1710;

Adam Weisweiler – 4 items:

- Paire de meubles à hauteur de'appui, c. 1780
- Paire de meubles à hauteur de'appui, c. 1785–1790

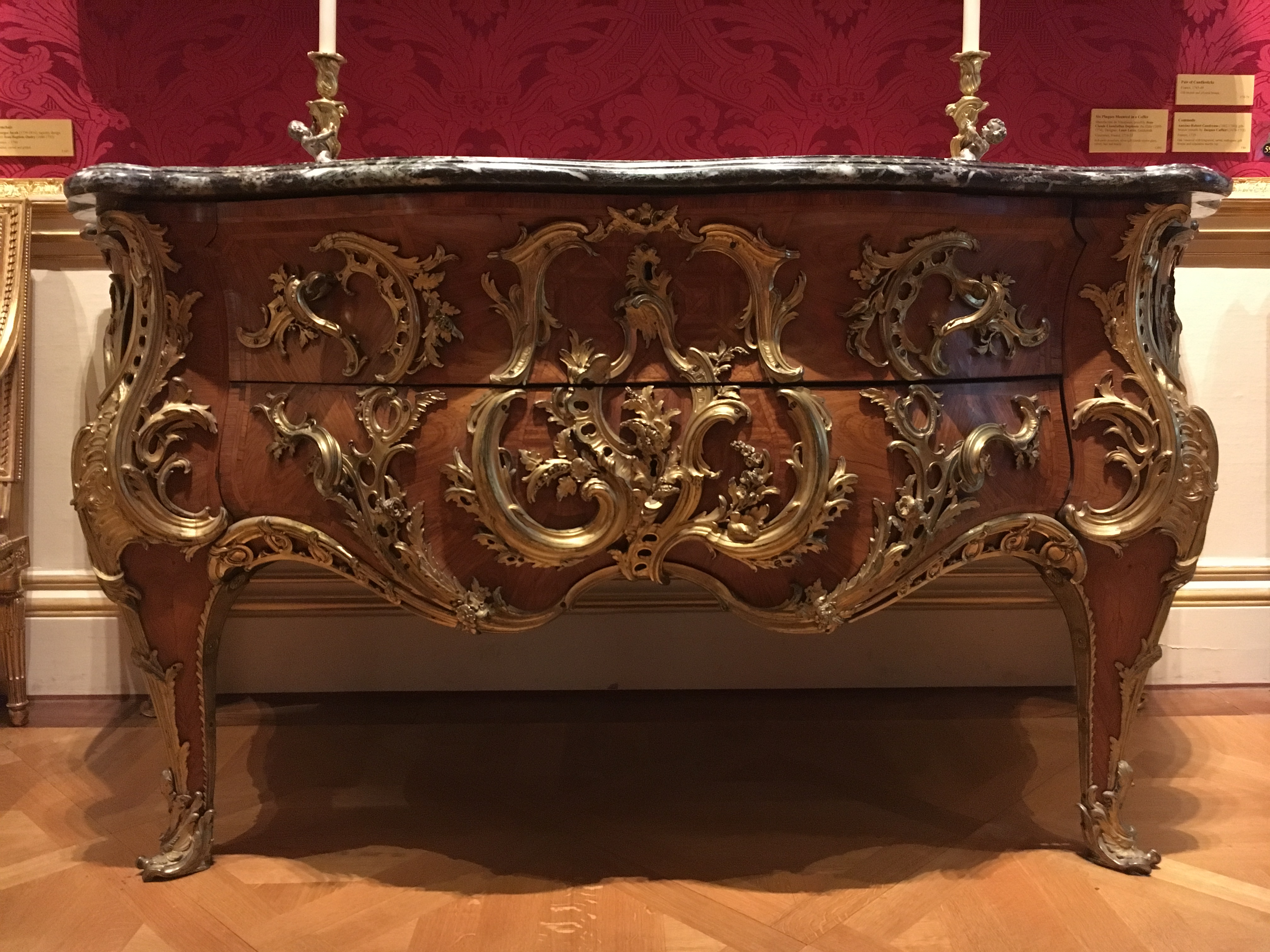
Antoine Gaudreau – This highly-important commode, with gilt-bronze mounts by Jacques Caffieri, was delivered in April 1739 for King Louis XV's Bedchamber at the Palace of Versailles.

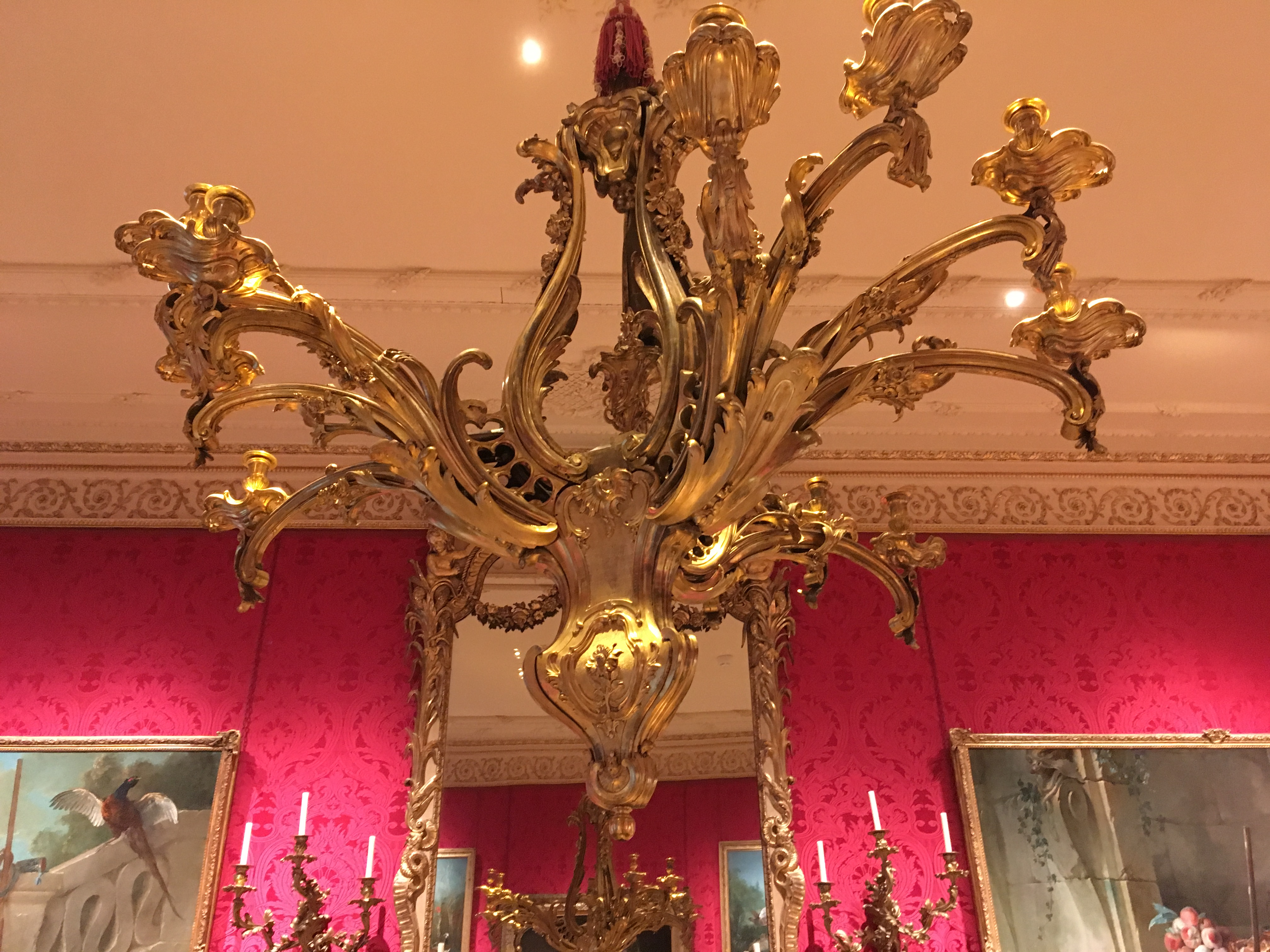
This twelve-light chandelier was made by Jacques Caffiéri in 1751. It was given by Louis XV to his eldest daughter, Louise-Elisabeth, Duchess of Parma, during one of her visits to Paris in the 1750s.

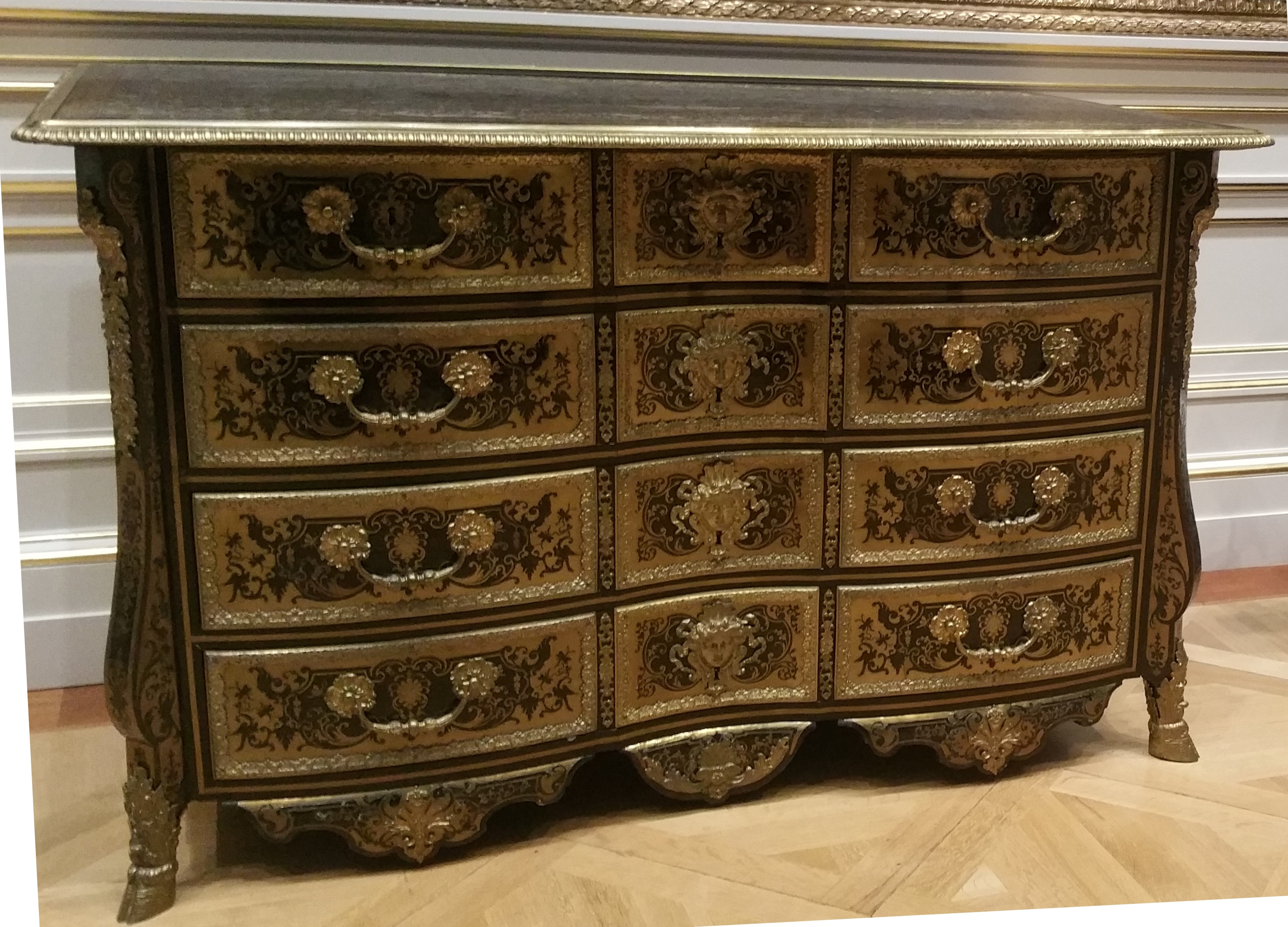
Example of Boulle marquetry made from brass inlaid with tortoiseshell

== Transport connections ==
Service	Station/stop	Lines/routes served	Distance from Wallace Collection
London Buses	Wigmore Street / Orchard St	13, 139	250m
London Underground	Bond Street	Central line Jubilee line	450m
