= Madame de Pompadour at her Tambour Frame =

Painting by François-Hubert Drouais

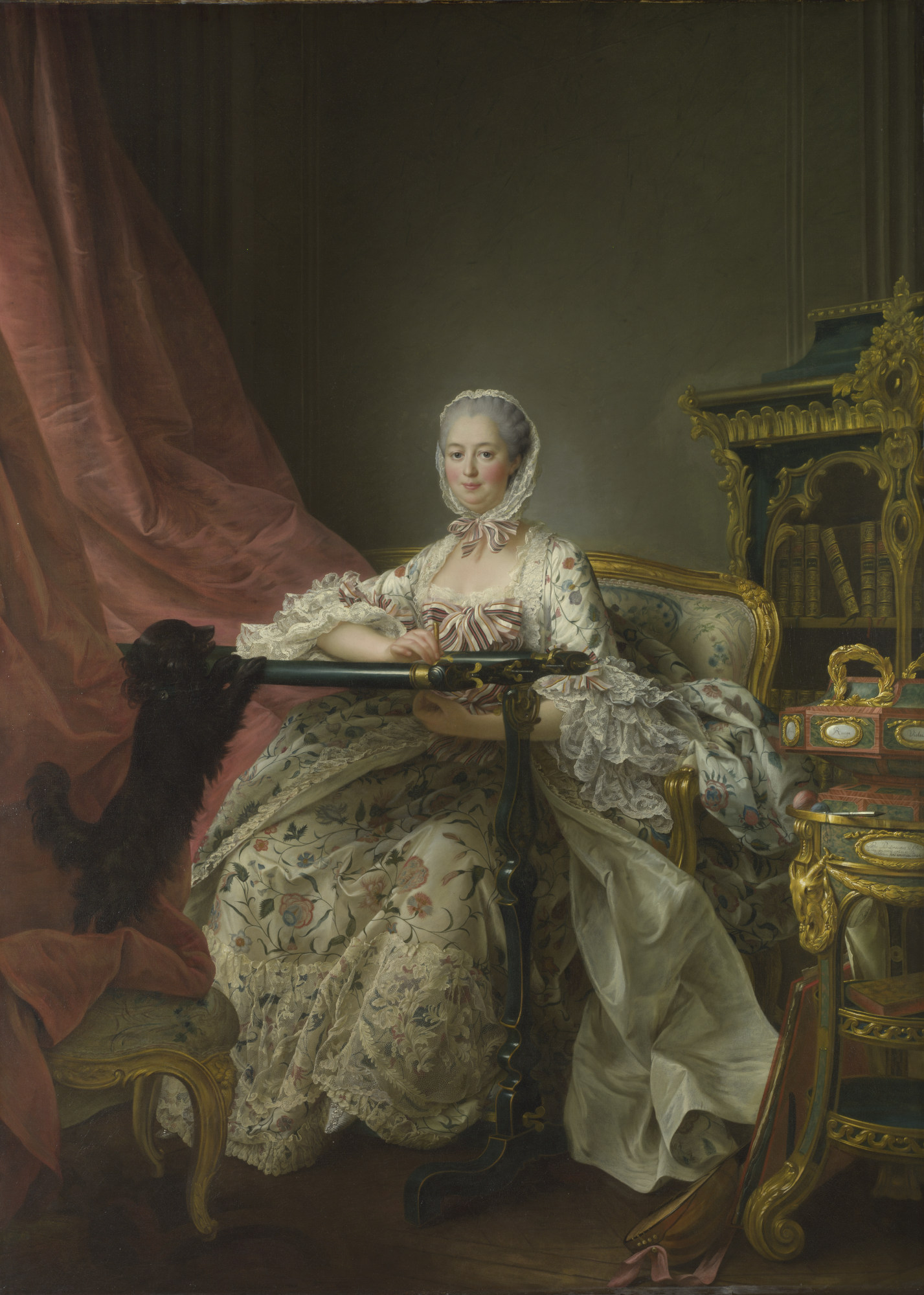
- Artist: François-Hubert Drouais
- Year: 1763 - 1764
- Medium: Oil on canvas
- Movement: Rococo
- Subject: Madame de Pompadour
- Dimensions: 217 cm × 157 cm (85 in × 62 in)
- Location: National Gallery, London

Madame de Pompadour at her Tambour Frame is a 1763–64 painting by François-Hubert Drouais showing Madame de Pompadour embroidering. It is now in the National Gallery, London. Until 1974 it was at Mentmore Towers as a part of the Rothchild collections.

== Background ==
The illegitimate daughter of a financier convicted of fraud, Madame de Pompadour had been Maîtresse-en-titre to King Louis XV of France, up until her death in 1764. She had been introduced by relatives to the court at Versailles, quickly becoming his preferred mistress, having met in 1745 at a masked ball. At court, she interacted with many enlightened thinkers such as Voltaire and Diderot. Pompadour retained her great influence over the King even after she had discontinued their sexual relationship. An artist herself, she was also a patroness of the arts, and was painted by artists such as François Boucher, in a series of portraits in the 1750s. Pompadour was also painted by leading artists such as Jean-Marc Nattier, Maurice Quentin de La Tour, and Carle van Loo. Having fallen victim to melancholy, she died in the spring of 1764, of a lung ailment, at the age of 42. She left an unfinished portrait by François-Hubert Drouais, who had trained with artists such as van Loo and Boucher.

== Analysis ==
In this portrait by Drouais, completed posthumously, she is seen in her apartment at Versailles "as an almost matronly figure" accompanied by her dog. It was commissioned by the sitter, and this large scale work features Pompadour seated at her tambour frame, in the action of embroidering. She stares directly at the viewer, "surrounded by luxurious objects which were very carefully chosen to convey her education, devotion to the arts, loyalty to the King, and femininity". She had sat for Drouais in the past, and it seems that she was pleased with the work that was done before her death, and there are multiple versions. Upon further inspection, the portrait is revealed to be made up of two canvases, one accompanying the head, shoulders and the right forearm, appearing to have been incorporated into a larger portrait. The National Gallery's description on their website says, "She appears demure, learned and polite". The surviving portrait is in good condition, and able to hang in its current state, despite minor scratches.

== Provenance ==
After Pompadour's death, the portrait was retained by the artist until it was presumably sold to her brother, the Marquis of Marigny, as was recorded in his posthumous inventory in 1781. By 1869, it had been sold into the collection of Mayer Amschel de Rothschild, a member of the Jewish banking family the Rothschilds. By 1883, it was located in the billiard room at Mentmore Towers, in Buckinghamshire, built for Baron Rothschild. In 1977 however, it was sold privately, to the National Gallery in London, for £385,000, and it has since remained at the gallery.

== Gallery ==
Other versions
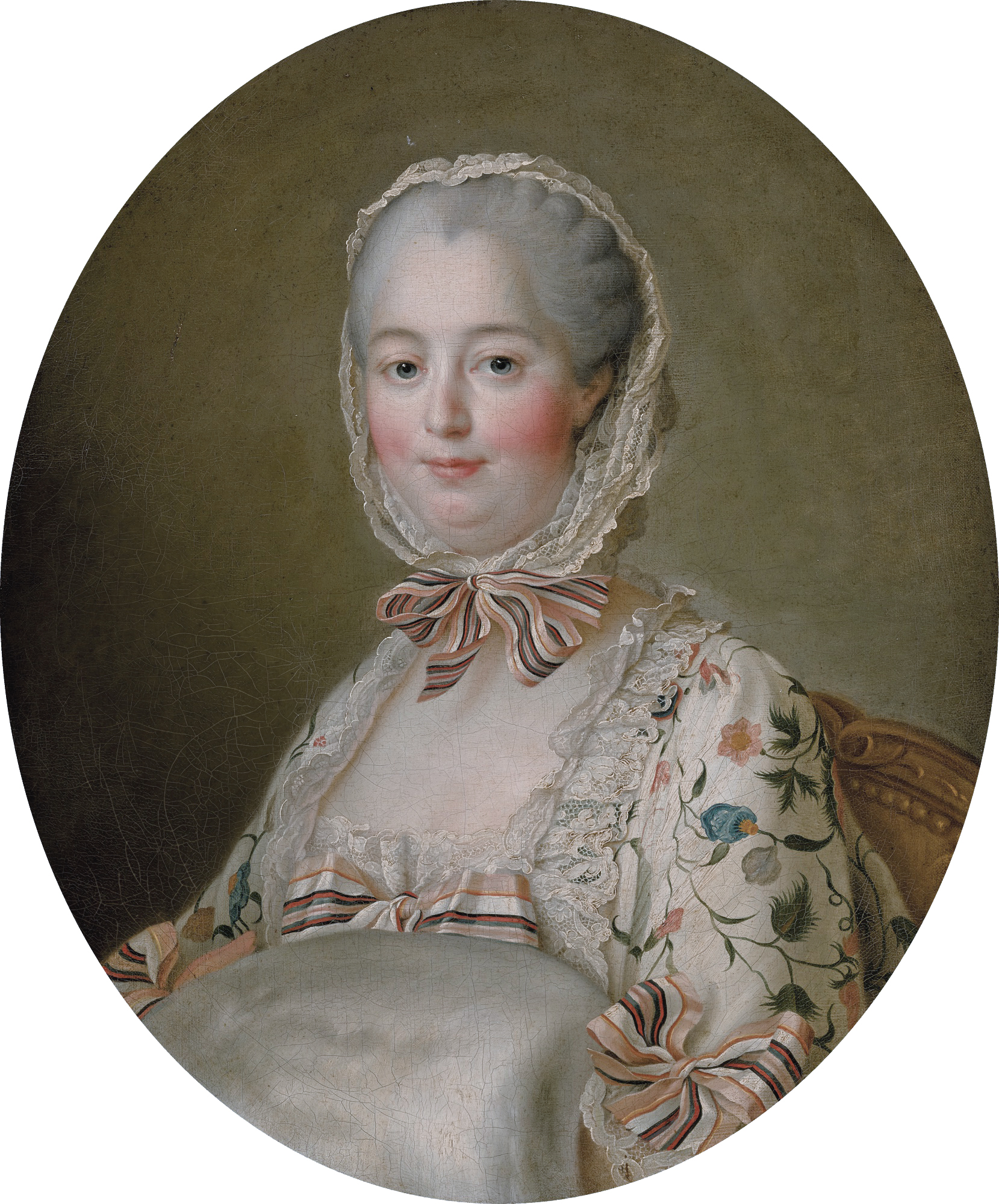

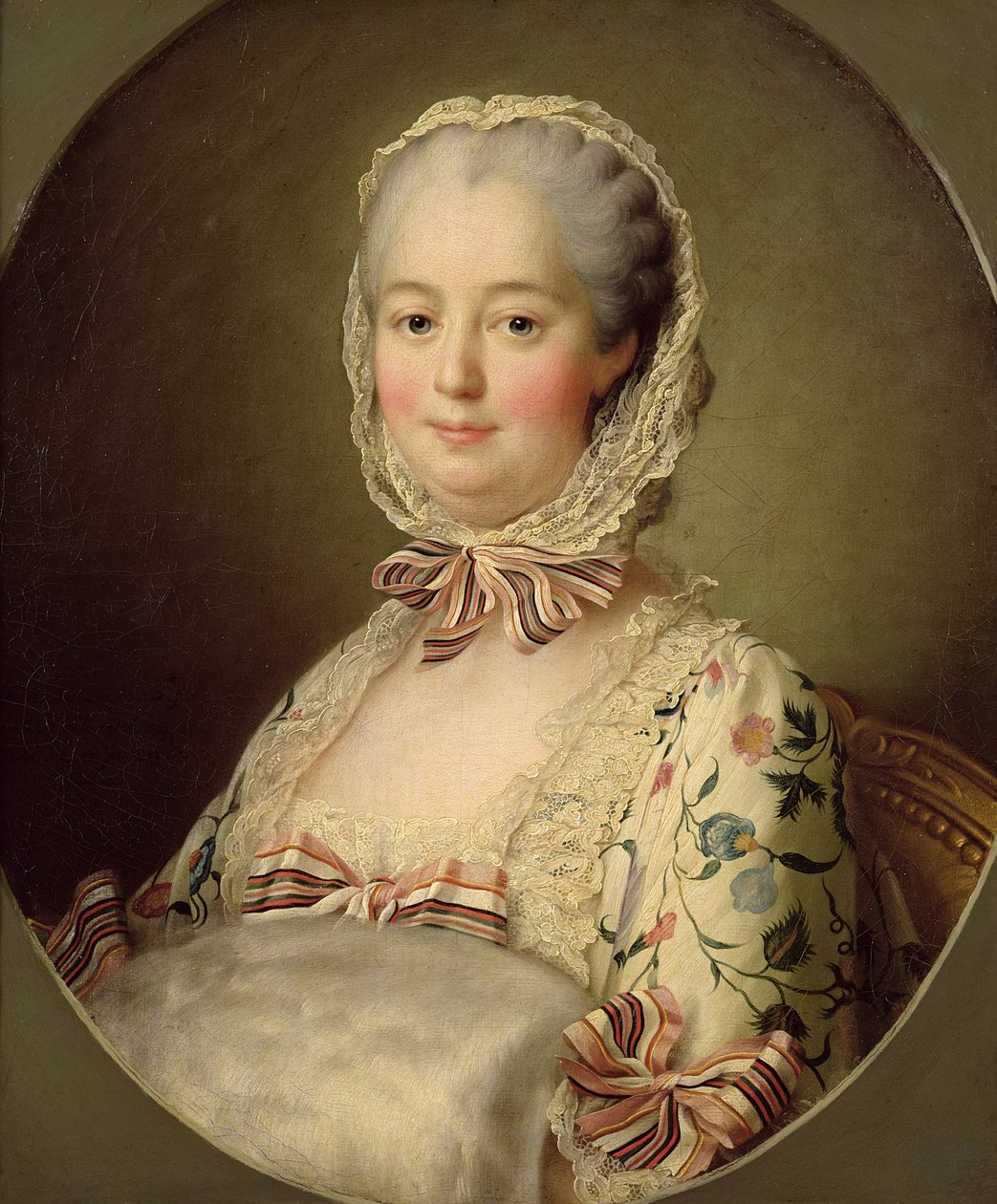

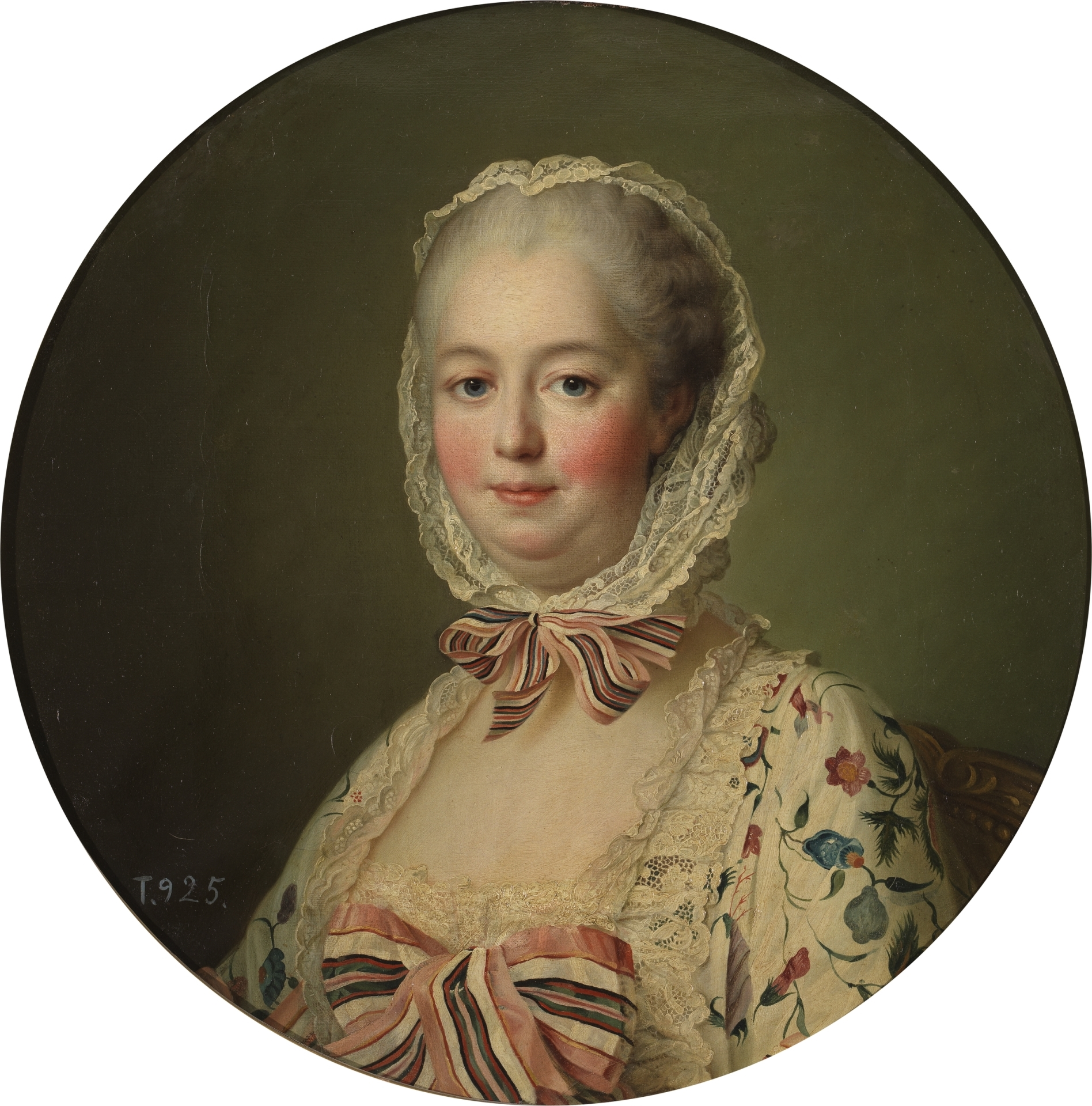

From left to right;

- Copy auctioned at Sotheby's in 2018, unidentified location
- Copy located at the Musée des Beaux-Arts d'Orléans, in Orléans, France
- Copy located at the Prado Museum in Madrid, Spain

All copies are by Drouais

== See also ==
- Portrait of Madame de Pompadour, another portrait of Pompadour, by François Boucher
