= Portrait of the Comte de Vaudreuil (Vigée Le Brun) =

Painting by Élisabeth Vigée Le Brun

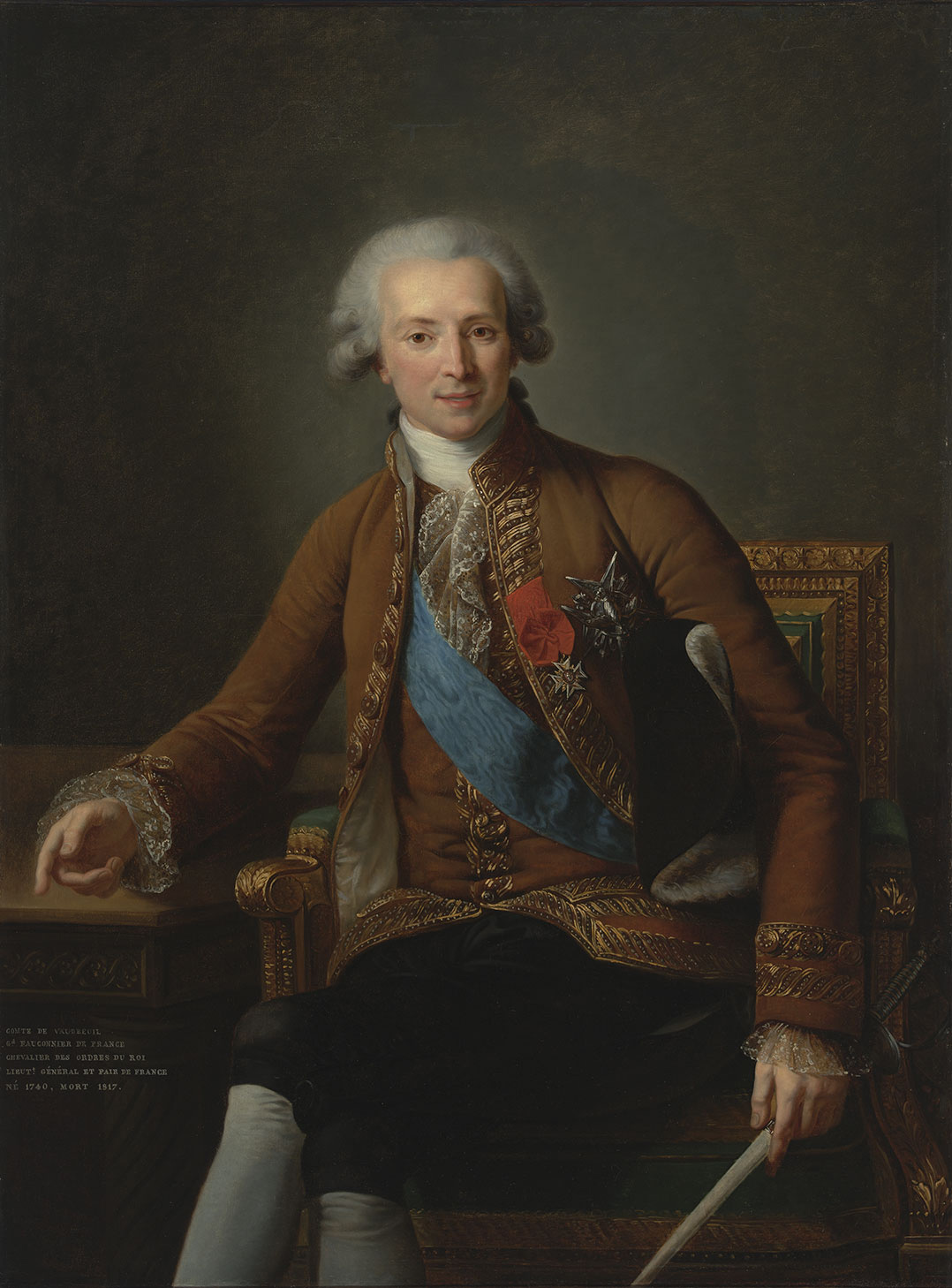
- Artist: Élisabeth Vigée Le Brun
- Year: 1784
- Type: Oil on canvas, portrait painting
- Dimensions: 52 cm × 39.3 cm (20 in × 15.5 in)
- Location: Virginia Museum of Fine Arts; Richmond

Portrait of the Comte de Vaudreuil is a 1784 portrait painting by the French artist Élisabeth Vigée Le Brun. It depicts the French aristocrat, soldier and courtier Joseph Hyacinthe François de Paule de Rigaud, Comte de Vaudreuil. Born in the colony of Saint-Domingue where his father was governor, Vaudreuil was a prominent figure at the court of Louis XVI. He was rumoured to be the lover of the Duchess of Polignac, a favourite of Marie Antoinette.

Today the painting is in the collection of the Virginia Museum of Fine Arts in Richmond, having been gifted to it in 1949. Vaudreuil had earlier sat for the 1758 Portrait of the Comte de Vaudreuil by François-Hubert Drouais, now in the National Gallery in London.

== Bibliography ==
- Baillio, Joseph & Baetjer, Katharine & Lang, Paul. Vigée Le Brun. Metropolitan Museum of Art, 2016.
- Helm, W.H. Elisabeth Louise Vigée-Lebrun. Parkstone International, 2018.
- May, Gita. Elisabeth Vigée Le Brun: The Odyssey of an Artist in an Age of Revolution. Yale University Press, 2008.
