= Marius at Minturnae =

Painting by Jean Germain Drouais

Marius and Minturnae
- Artist: Jean Germain Drouais
- Year: 1786
- Type: Oil on canvas, history painting
- Dimensions: 271 cm × 365 cm (107 in × 144 in)
- Location: Louvre, Paris

Marius at Minturnae (French: Marius prisonnier à Minturnes) is a 1786 neoclassical history painting by the French artist Jean Germain Drouais.It depicts a scene from the life of the Ancient Roman general Gaius Marius, when he was imprisoned at Minturnae

It was produced in Rome where Drouais was studying having won the Prix de Rome in 1784 with Christ and the Canaanite Woman. A pupil of Jacques-Louis David, Drouais was one of the most highly regarded prospects in French art before his death in 1788. Stylistically it draws on David's Oath of the Horatii. Today the painting is in the collection of the Louvre in Paris, having been acquired in 1816.

== Bibliography ==
- Crow, Thomas. Emulation; Making Artists for Revolutionary France. Yale University Press, 1995.
- Rosenblum, Robert & Janson, Horst Woldemar (ed.) 19th-century Art. Prentice Hall, 2005.

:
