= Archduke Leopold Wilhelm Hunting Heron =

Painting by David Teniers the Younger

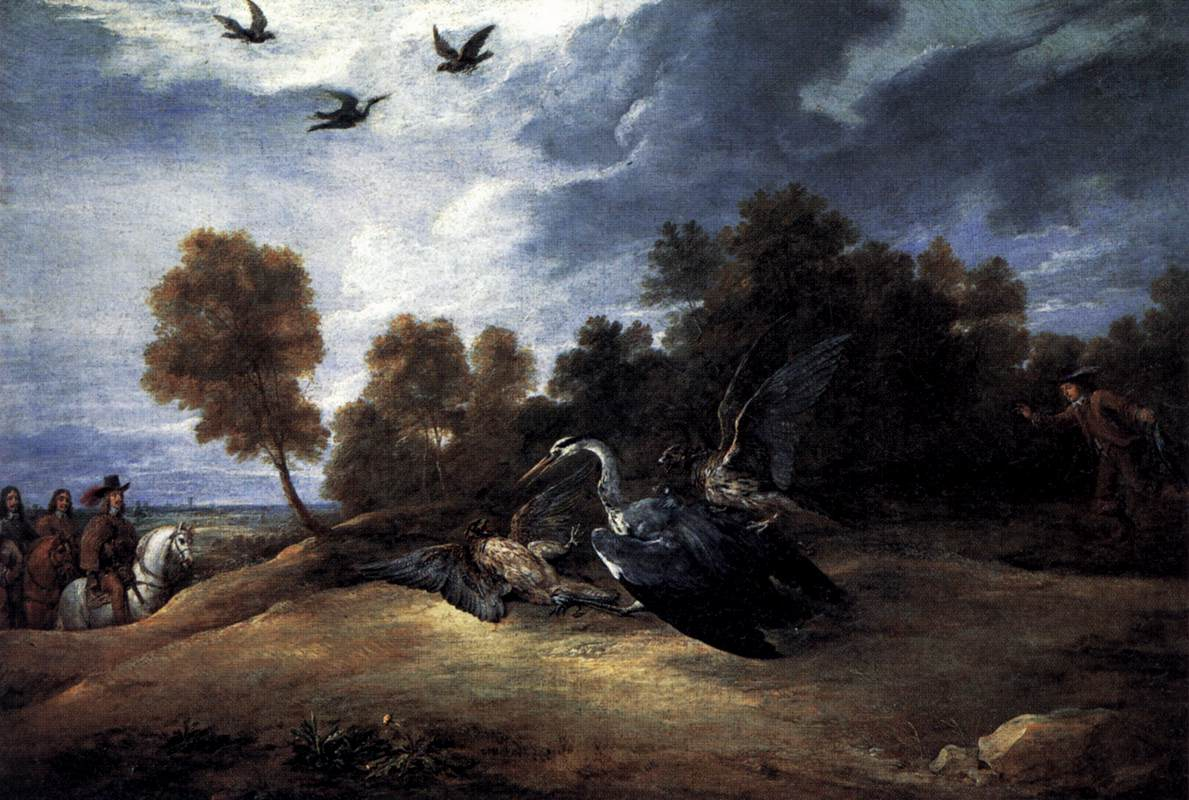
Archduke Leopold Wilhelm Hunting Heron (ca. 1652–1656) by David Teniers the Younger

Archduke Leopold Wilhelm Hunting Heron or Heron Hunting Scene with Archduke Leopold Wilhelm is an oil-on-canvas painting executed ca. 1652–1656 by the Flemish artist David Teniers the Younger, now in the Louvre Museum in Paris. A simple scene of falcons being used to hunt heron on the surface, it conceals a political allegory.

Archduke Leopold Wilhelm of Austria became governor of the Spanish Netherlands in 1647, making Teniers his official court painter and curator of his art collection in the region's capital, Brussels, seen in the background. Five years later the Prince de Condé (loyal to Philip IV of Spain) took his army to the Spanish Netherlands, leading to a conflict with Louis XIV's France in the south of the Spanish-held region, a conflict which set the context for the painting.

At that time a struggle between a heron and a falcon was a commonly held symbol of a battle with an uncertain outcome, with the heron here representing the Spanish Netherlands, under attack from both France and the Dutch Republic (the two falcons shown) but still hopeful of victory rather than resigned to defeat.

Until 1784 it was in the collection of Joseph Hyacinthe François-de-Paule de Rigaud, comte de Vaudreuil, France's Grand Falconer. Hit by financial problems, he sold off his art collection in two public auctions in 1784 and 1787. Hunting Heron was bought as lot 32 at the first sale by Louis XVI, along with around thirty other paintings, mostly Flemish and Dutch and all intended for the royal collections in the Grande Galerie of the Louvre Palace.
