= Catherine Lusurier =

French artist (1752–1781)

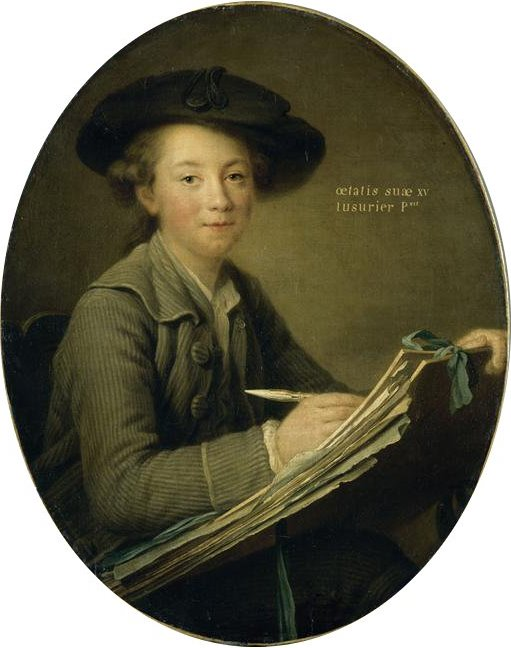
Catherine Lusurier, The Painter Germain-Jean Drouais at the Age of Fifteen, oil on canvas, c. 1778

Catherine Lusurier (1752 – 11 January 1781) was a French painter.

Lusurier was a native of Paris; her mother, Jeanne Callot, was a dressmaker, while her father Pierre was a member of a family of hatters. She was the niece of Hubert Drouais, to whom she was apprenticed until his death, whereupon she continued to live with his widow, Marie–Marguerite Lusurier, on the rue des Orties in the parish of Saint-Roch; today the street no longer exists, having been torn up to make way for the avenue de l'Opéra during the Second Empire.

While in their atelier, she likely worked alongside François-Hubert Drouais and his son Jean Germain Drouais. Twenty-one paintings, including portraits of Jean Drouais as a boy and of Jean le Rond d'Alembert, have been ascribed to Lusurier, who was only twenty-eight at the time of her death. A drawing of a boy is owned by the National Gallery of Art, and a portrait of a girl, formerly ascribed to François-Hubert Drouais, is in the collection of the Milwaukee Art Museum. The portrait of Jean Drouais is owned by the Louvre, while that of d'Alembert is in the Carnavalet Museum.

== Gallery ==
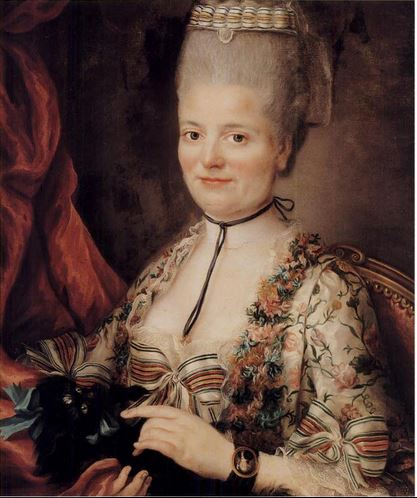
Jeanne Therese Tilles D'Acosta, Madame la Marquise de Rochambeau

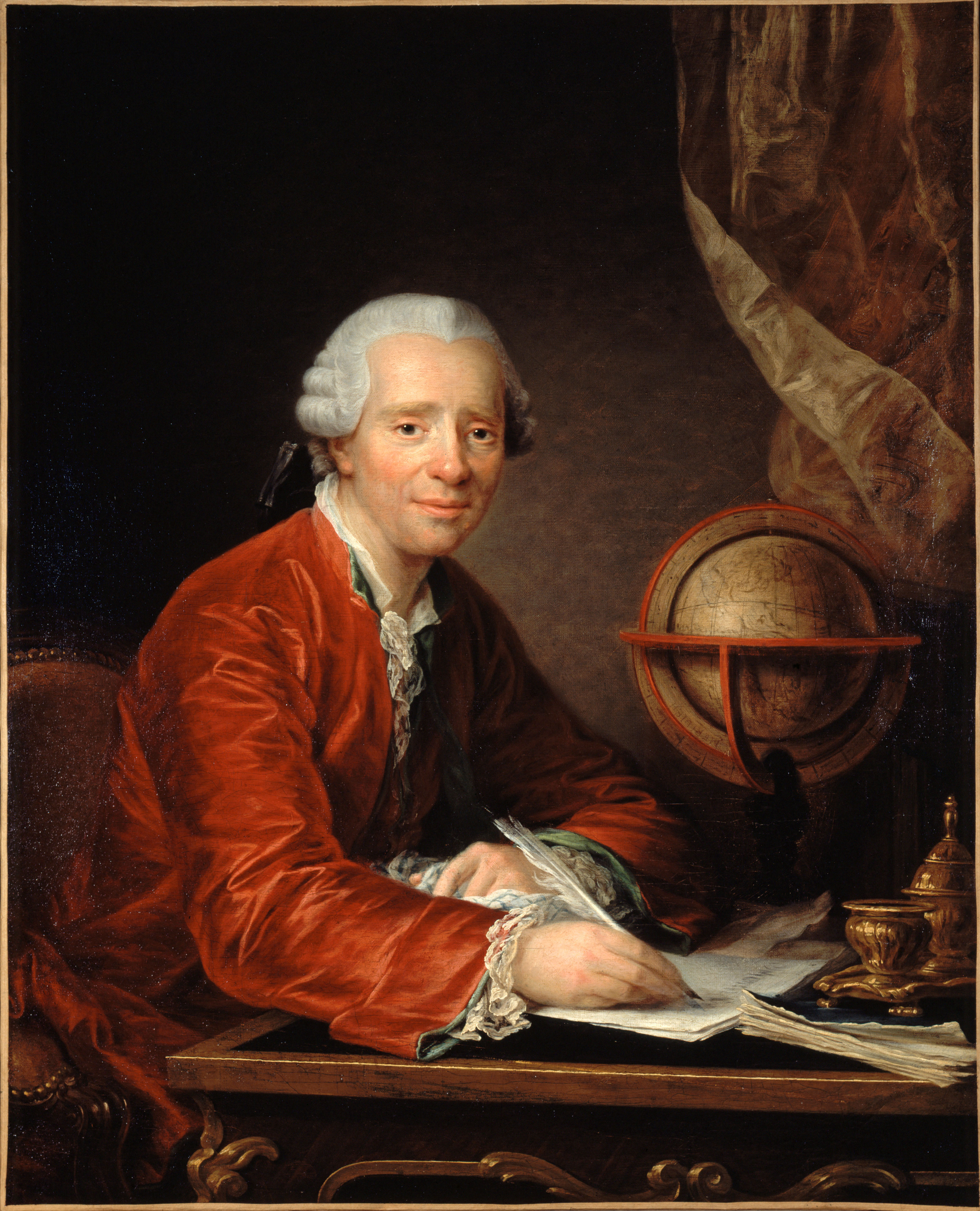
Jean Le Rond d'Alembert, 1777

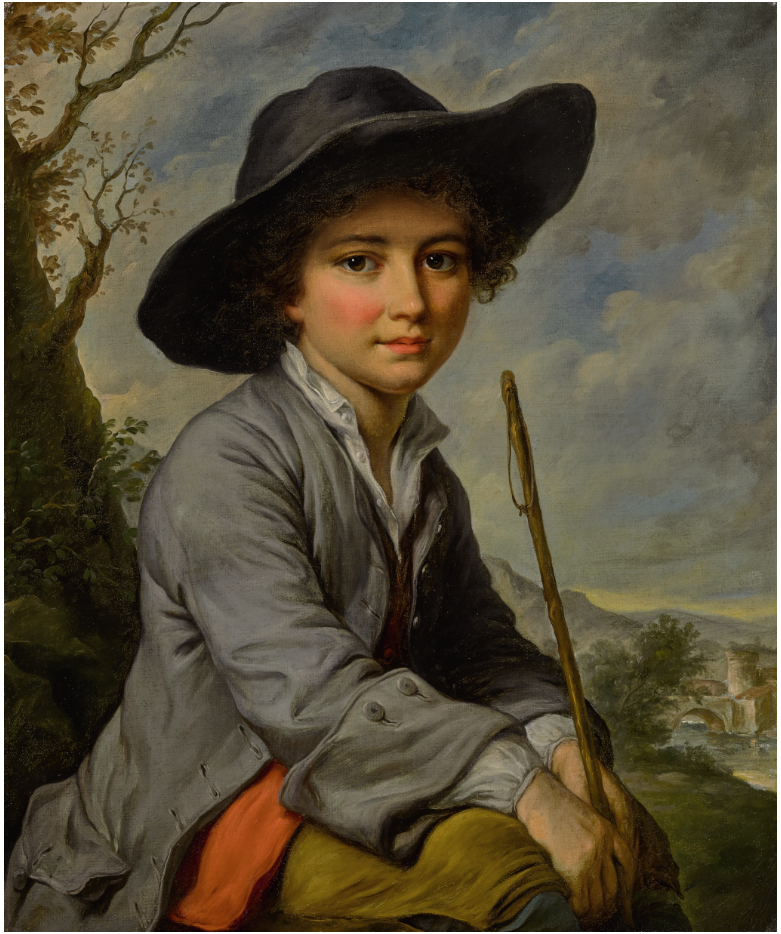
A young boy seated in a landscape
