= The Wounded Warrior =

Painting by Jean Germain Drouais

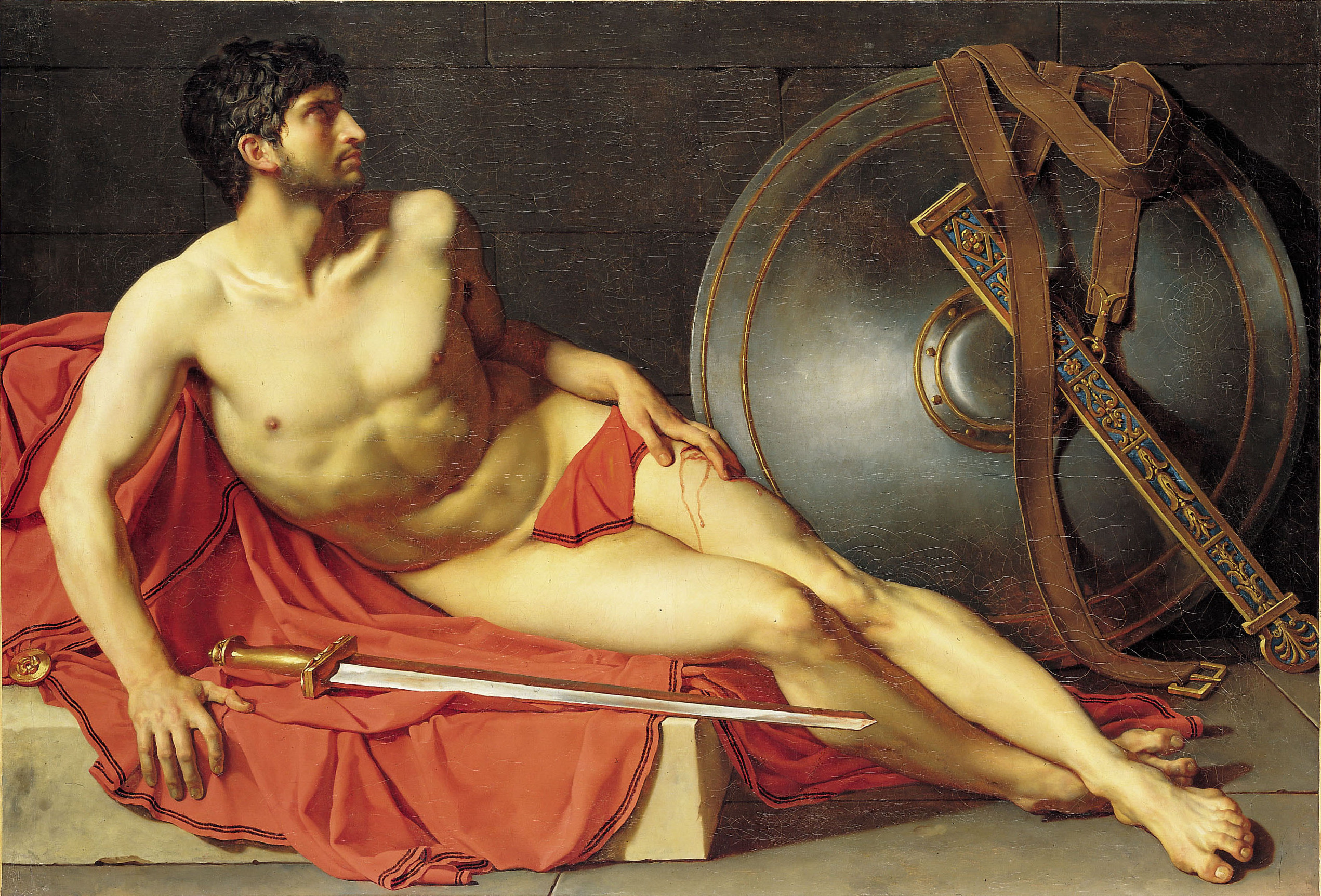
- Artist: Jean Germain Drouais
- Year: 1785
- Type: Oil on canvas, history painting
- Dimensions: 125 cm × 182 cm (49 in × 72 in)
- Location: Louvre; Paris

The Wounded Warrior is a 1785 oil painting by the French artist Jean Germain Drouais. Neoclassical in style it combines elements of history painting and nude art. It features the body of a man from the Ancient World, often identified as either a Roman soldier or gladiator. It was produced while Drouais was in Rome where he has been living since winning the Prix de Rome the previous year and sent to the French Royal Academy in Paris. While he originally titled it The Dying Athlete it became known by this alternative title and was engraved under that name.

Drouais died three years later at the age of just twenty four. Today the painting is in the collection of the Louvre Museum.

== Bibliography ==
- Crow, Thomas. Emulation; Making Artists for Revolutionary France. Yale University Press, 1995.
