= Christ and the Canaanite Woman (Drouais) =

Painting by Jean Germain Drouais

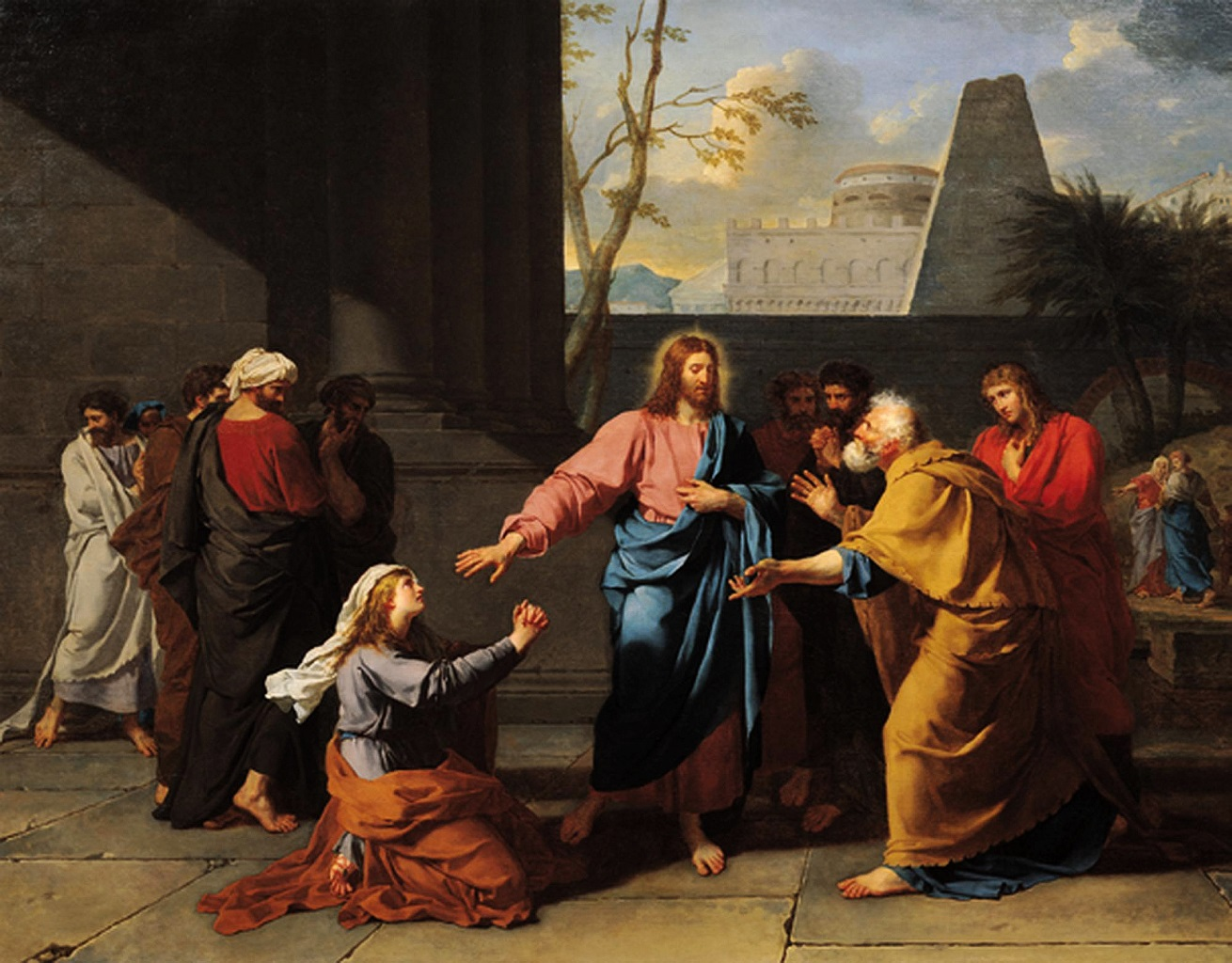
- Artist: Jean Germain Drouais
- Year: 1784
- Type: Oil on canvas, history painting
- Dimensions: 114 cm × 146 cm (45 in × 57 in)
- Location: Louvre; Paris

Christ and the Canaanite Woman is a 1784 religious history painting by the French artist Jean Germain Drouais.

Neoclassical in style, it depicts a scene from the New Testament story of the Healing of the Canaanite Woman's Daughter.

Drouais was a noted pupil of Jacques-Louis David and was the son of the portrait painter François-Hubert Drouais. He produced this work as his submission for the Prix de Rome competition that year, which he won. This earned him the right to study in Rome for four years. His promising career was cut short by his death at the age of twenty four in 1788. Today the painting is in the collection of the Louvre, in Paris.

== Bibliography ==
- Crow, Thomas. Emulation; Making Artists for Revolutionary France. Yale University Press, 1995.
