= Portrait of the Comte de Vaudreuil (Drouais) =

Painting by François-Hubert Drouais

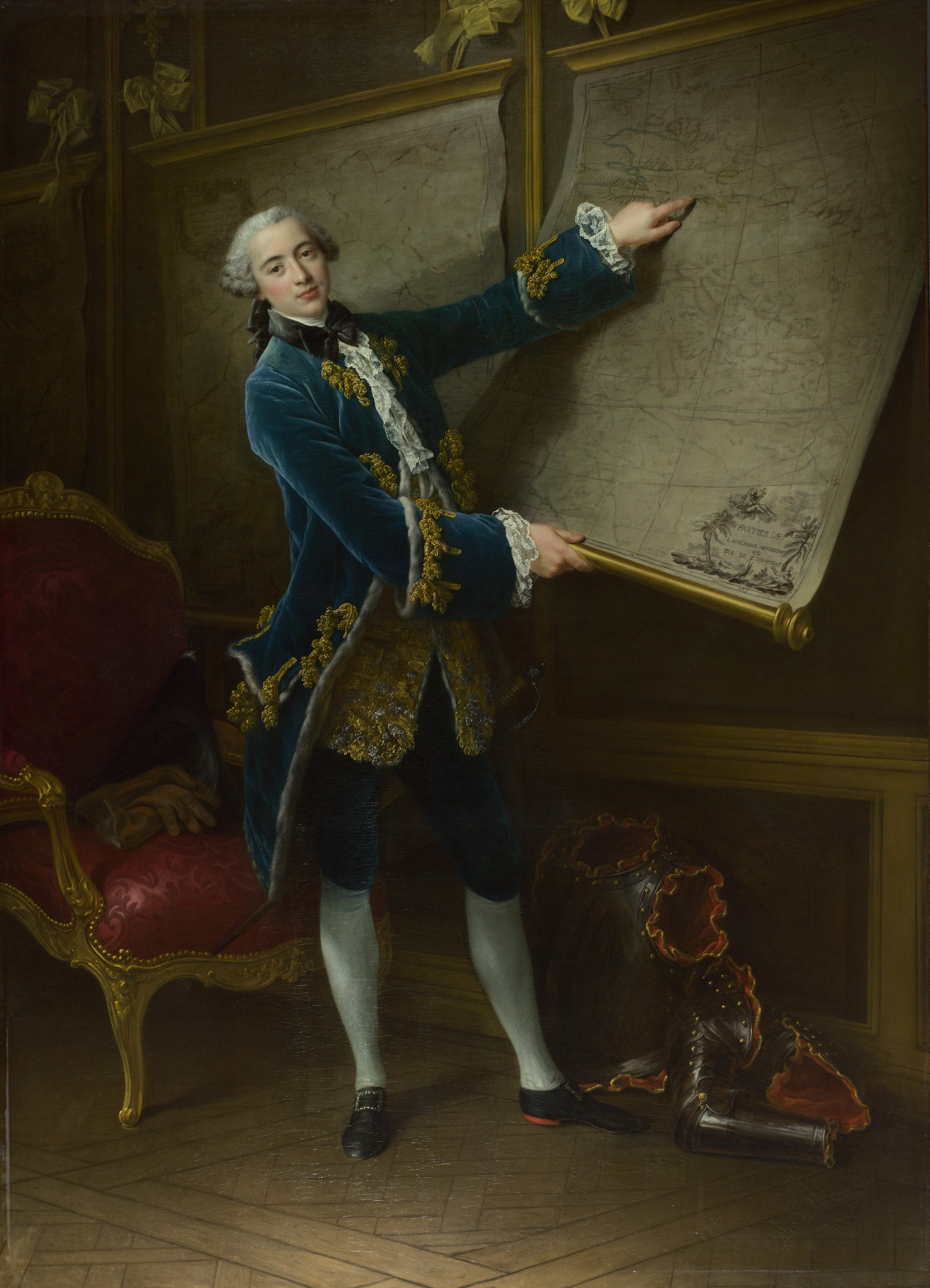
- Artist: François-Hubert Drouais
- Year: 1758
- Type: Oil on canvas, portrait painting
- Dimensions: 225.4 cm × 161.3 cm (88.7 in × 63.5 in)
- Location: National Gallery; London

Portrait of the Comte de Vaudreuil is an oil on canvas portrait painting by the French artist François-Hubert Drouais, from 1758. It is held in the National Gallery, in London, having been acquired in 1927.

== History and description ==
It depicts the young aristocrat and soldier Joseph Hyacinthe François de Paule de Rigaud, Comte de Vaudreuil. The eighteen-year old came from the French colony of Saint-Domingue, in the Caribbean, where his father, the Marqis de Vaudreuil, served as governor. He is dressed in a very elegant attire, and his gloves and tricorn can be seen laid in the chair, behind him. The young nobleman is shown pointing at Saint-Domingue on a map.

Vaudreuil served in the French Army during the Seven Years' War and the year of the painting took part in the Battle of Rossbach. Probably as a reminder of that, some armor can be seen at his feet. He was later a prominent courtier under Louis XVI, in the years before the French Revolution.

In 1784 Vaudreuil was also painted by Élisabeth Vigée Le Brun, a work now in the Virginia Museum of Fine Arts.

== See also ==
- Portrait of the Comte de Vaudreuil by Élisabeth Vigée Le Brun

== Bibliography ==
- Milner, Frank. Goya. Smithmark, 1995.
- Quilley, Geoff & Kriz, Kay Dian. An Economy of Colour: Visual Culture and the North Atlantic World, 1660-1830. Manchester University Press, 2003.
- Scott, Katie & Williams, Hannah. Artists' Things: Rediscovering Lost Property from Eighteenth-Century France. Getty Publications, 2024.
