= Jean Germain Drouais =

French painter (1763–1788)

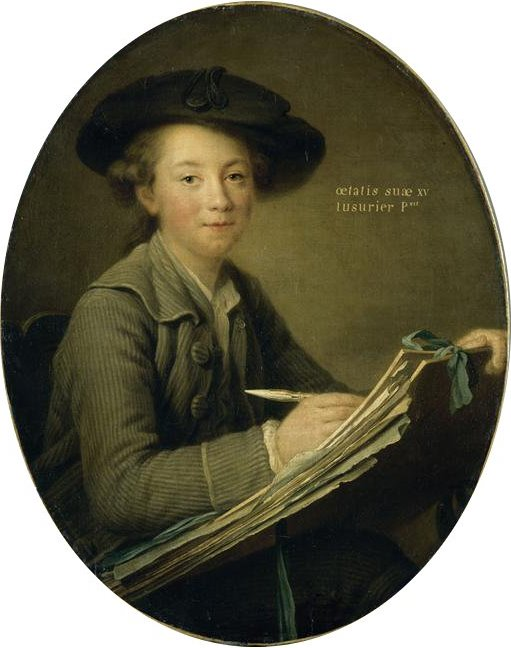
Portrait of Drouais, by Catherine Lusurier (c.1778)

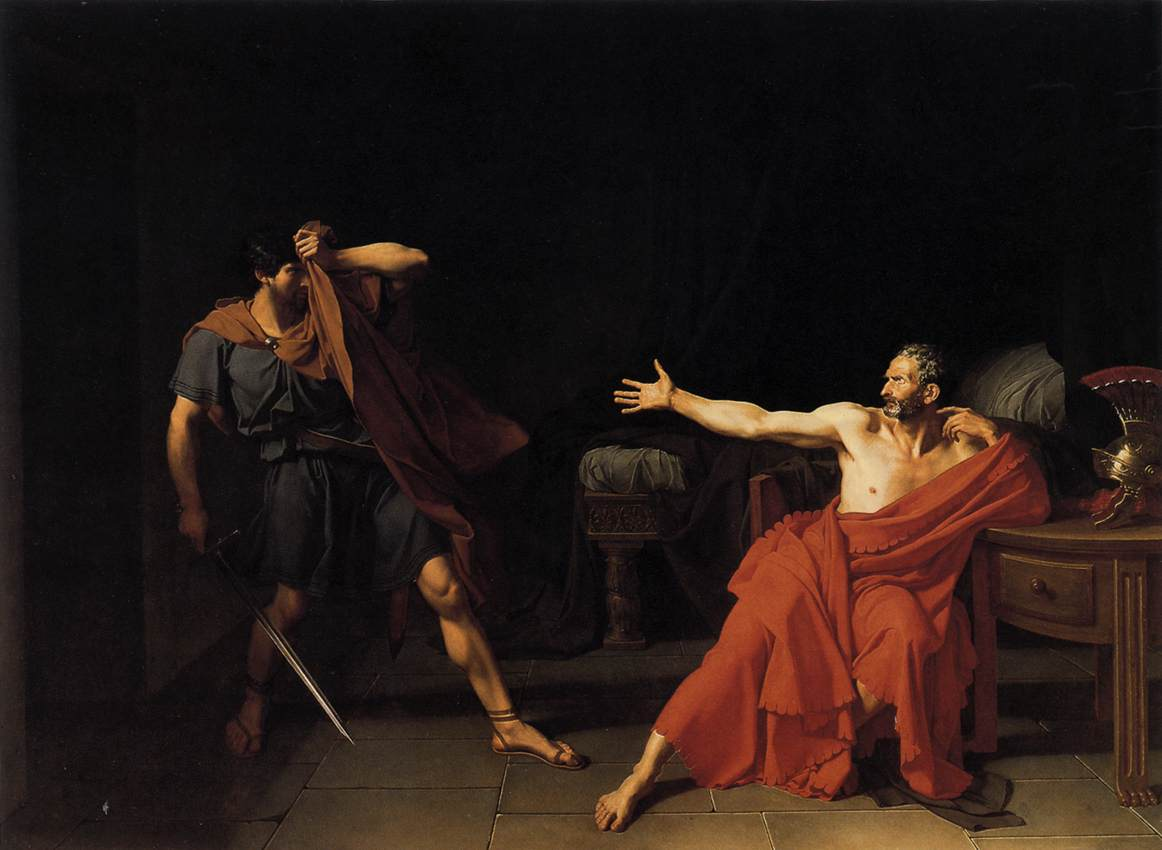
Jean Germain Drouais, Marius at Minturnae, 1786, Oil on canvas, 271 cm x 365 cm. Louvre

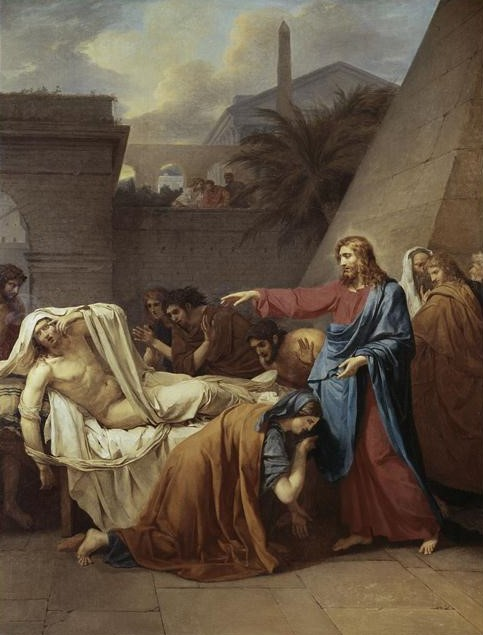
The Resurrection of the Son of the Widow of Nain, 1783

Jean Germain Drouais (French: [ʒɑ̃ ʒɛʁmɛ̃ dʁwɛ]; 25 November 1763 – 13 February 1788), French historical painter, was born in Paris. His father, François-Hubert Drouais, and his grandfather, Hubert Drouais, were well-known portrait painters; it was from his father that he received his first artistic instruction.

== Early years ==
He was afterwards entrusted to the care of Brenet, an excellent teacher, though his own pictures did not take high rank. In 1780 Jacques-Louis David, who had just returned from Rome, opened a school of painting in Paris, and Drouais was one of his earliest and most promising pupils. He adopted the classical style of his master, giving his days to study painting and spending a great part of every night in designing. For weeks together it is said that he never left his studio.

== Career ==
In 1783 he was admitted to compete for the great prize of painting offered by the Academy the Prix de Rome, the subject being the Widow of Nain. After inspecting the works of his fellow-competitors, however, he lost hope and destroyed his own canvas, but was consoled by the assurance of his master David that he had not done badly, and would have won the prize. This was further revealed by the fact that no first prize was awarded in 1783 after his work was withdrawn. The next year he was triumphantly successful, the Woman of Canaan at the Feet of Christ, with which he gained the 3-5 year grant to study in Rome, being compared by competent critics with the works of Poussin. He was carried shoulder high by his fellow-students through the streets to his mother's house, and a place was afterward found for his picture in the Louvre. His success making him only the more eager to perfect himself in his art, he accompanied David to Rome in 1783, where he worked even more assiduously than in Paris. He was most strongly influenced by the remains of ancient art and by the works of Raphael. Goethe, who was at Rome at the time it was finished, has recorded the deep impression made by his Marius at Minturnae, which he characterizes as in some respects superior to the work of David, his master. The last picture that he completed was his Philoctetes on the Island of Lemnos.

== Death ==
Drouais died in 1788 in Rome. Following his death, a monument to his memory was erected by his fellow-students in the church of Santa Maria in the Via Lata.

== Gallery ==
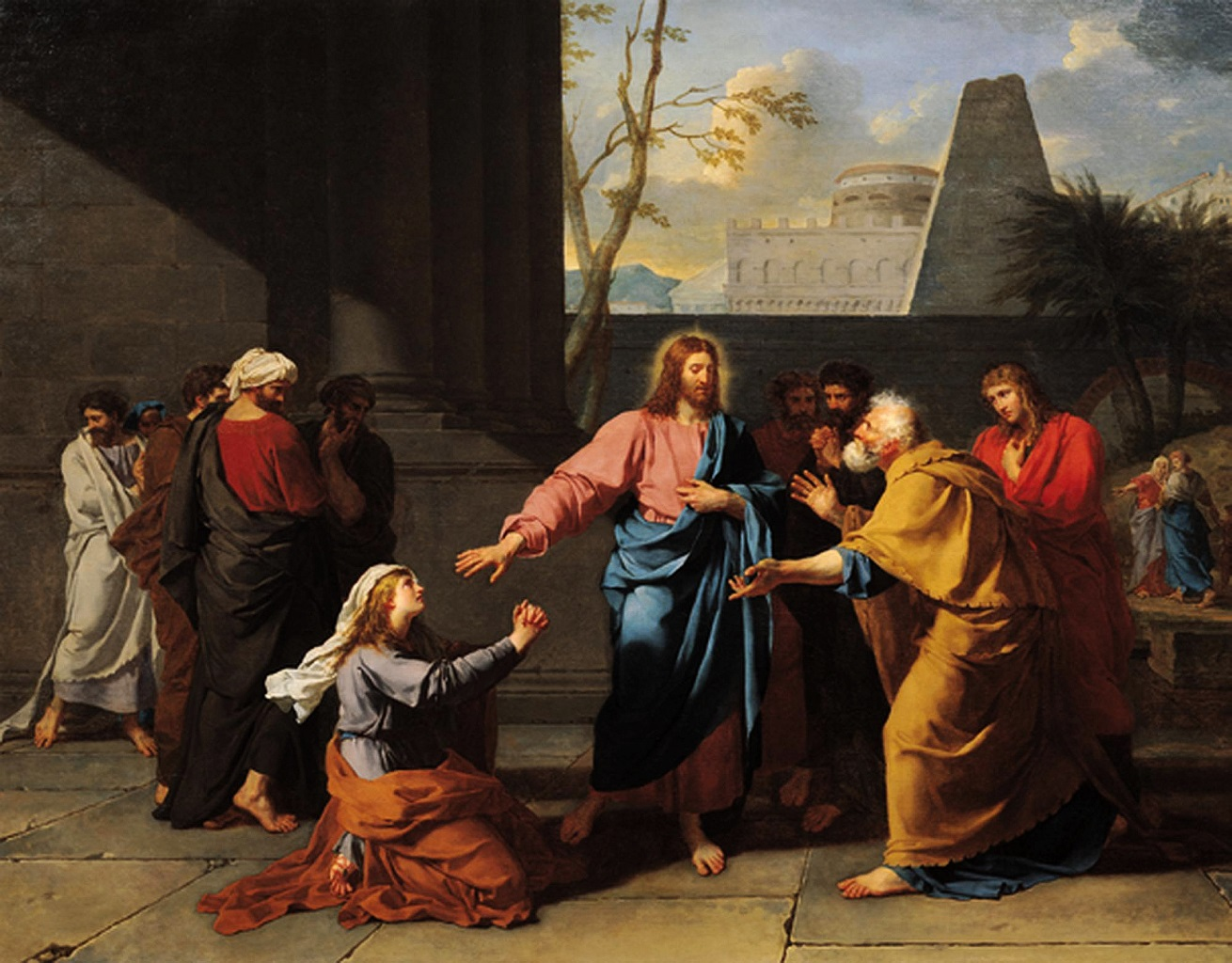
Christ and the Canaanite Woman, 1784

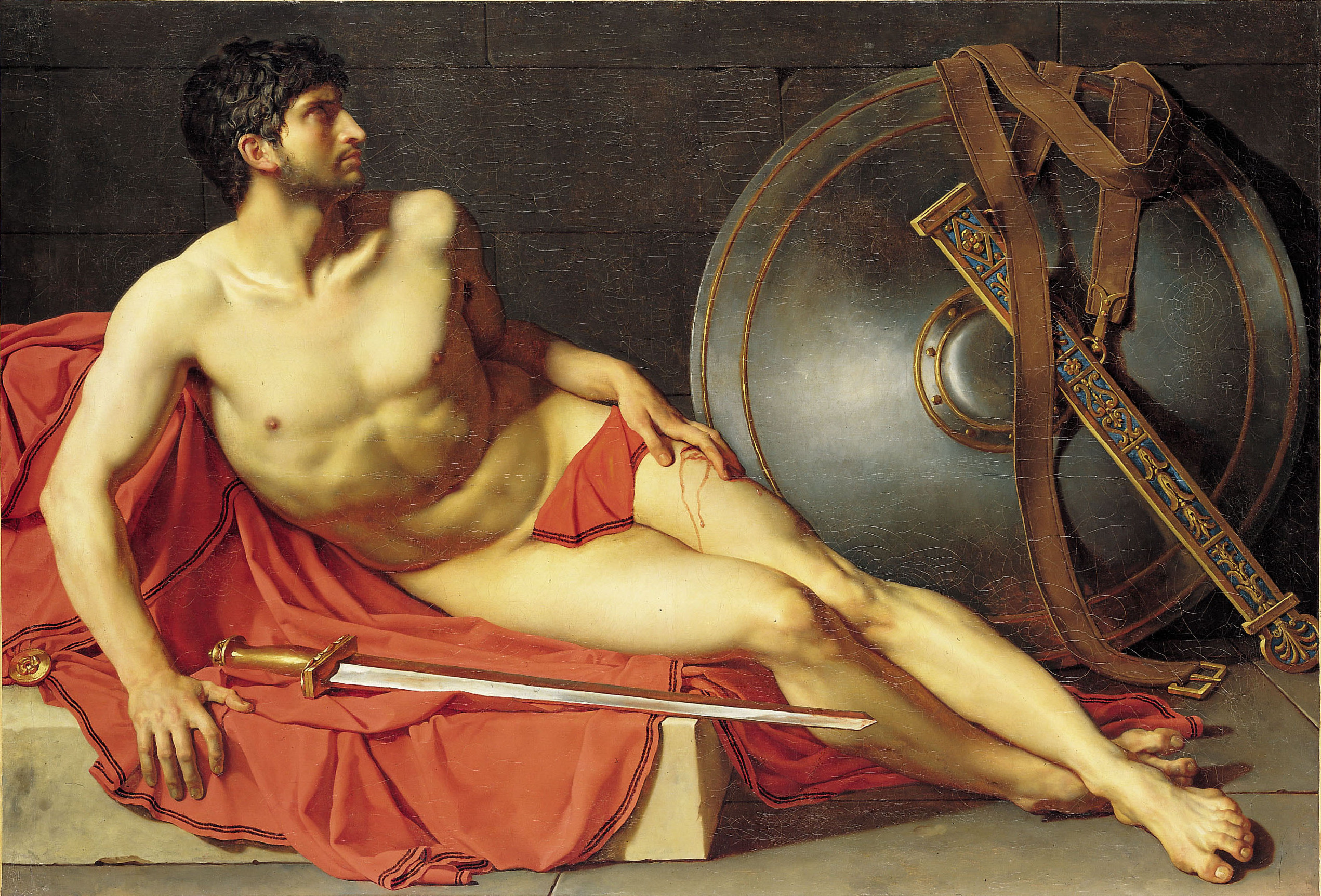
The Wounded Warrior, 1785
