= Joseph Hyacinthe François de Paule de Rigaud, Comte de Vaudreuil =

Saint Dominican nobleman

Joseph Hyacinthe François de Paule de Rigaud
- Count of Vaudreuil
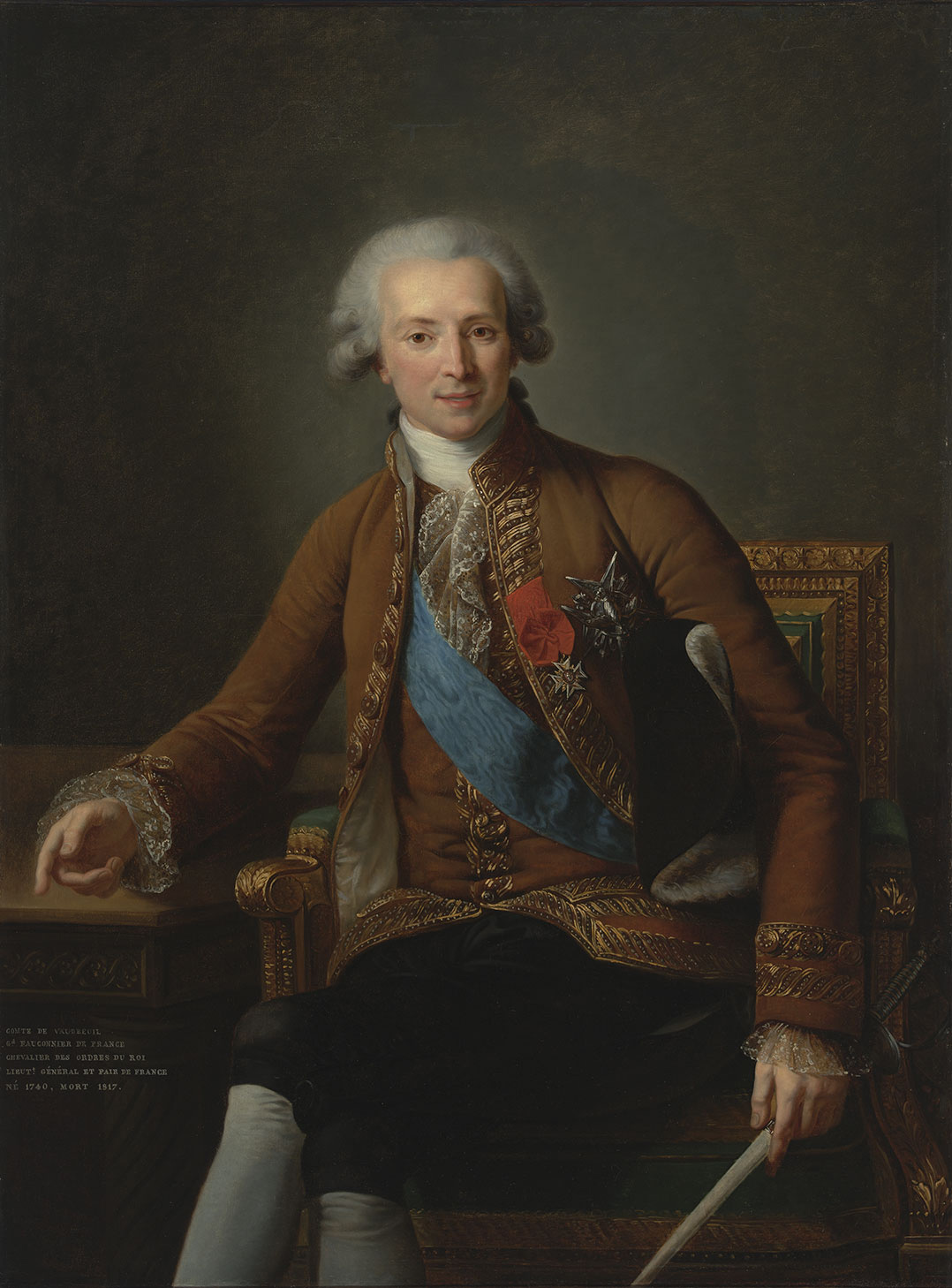
- Portrait of the Comte de Vaudreuil by Élisabeth Vigée Le Brun, 1784
- Born: 2 March 1740; Saint-Domingue, West Indies
- Died: 1817 (aged 76–77)
- Spouse: Marie Joséphine de Rigaud de Vaudreuil (m. 1795)
- Issue: Charles Philippe de Rigaud de Vaudreuil; Victor Louis de Rigaud de Vaudreuil
- Father: Joseph de Rigaud, Marquis de Vaudreuil
- Mother: Françoise Guiot de la Mirande

Joseph Hyacinthe François de Paule de Rigaud, comte de Vaudreuil (2 March 1740 – 1817) was a Saint Dominican French nobleman at the court of King Louis XVI. He was the alleged lover of Gabrielle de Polastron, duchesse de Polignac, the favourite of Marie Antoinette and over whom he exerted a powerful influence.

He was a connoisseur and collector of art, and a patron of artist Élisabeth Vigée Le Brun, who painted two known portraits of him in 1784.

== Versailles ==
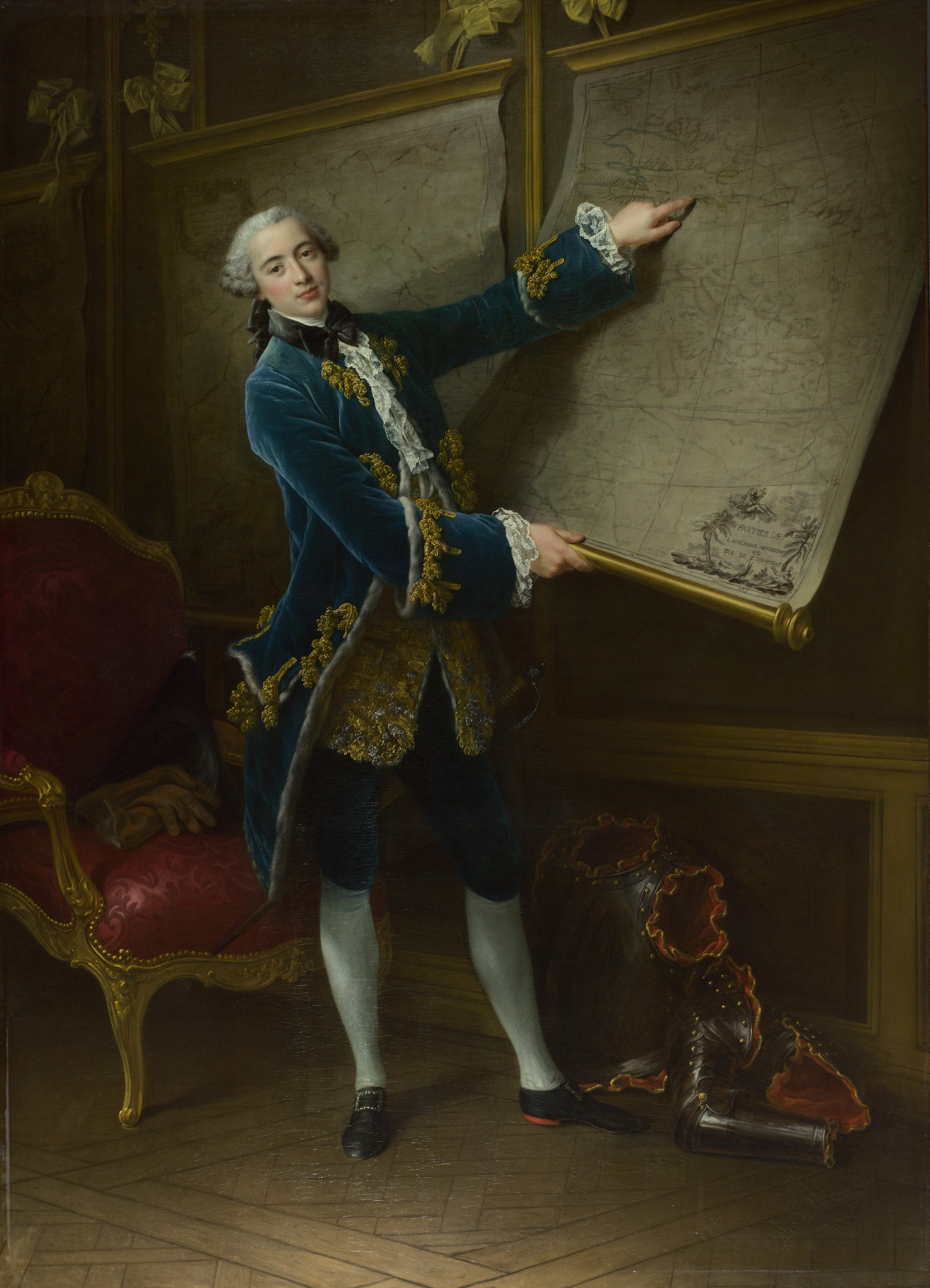
Portrait of the Comte de Vaudreuil by François-Hubert Drouais, 1758. He is depicted pointing to his native Saint-Domingue on the map.

The Comte de Vaudreuil was born in Saint-Domingue, West Indies, the son of Joseph de Rigaud (1706–1764), Marquis de Vaudreuil, the French governor of the island, and his aristocratic white Creole wife, Françoise Guiot de la Mirande. His paternal grandfather, Philippe de Rigaud, Marquis de Vaudreuil, was Governor General of New France. At the age of nineteen, he entered the army and during the Seven Years' War served as staff officer under Charles, Prince of Soubise. When the war ended, he moved to Paris.

At the French court, he attached himself to the king's youngest brother, the comte d'Artois (later Charles X of France), and formed a strong attachment to the beautiful Gabrielle de Polastron, Duchesse de Polignac, an intimate friend of Queen Marie Antoinette and one of the leaders of high society at Versailles. The liaison with Gabrielle de Polastron was viewed as sexual by many observers then and since, but some suggested that Gabrielle's nature was too essentially cold, class-conscious (given Vaudreuil's Creole ancestry) or remote to have succumbed to an affair. Many of her friends despised him, but whatever the nature of their relationship, whether it was sexual or not, she found it increasingly hard to resist his domineering demands for her attention and support. Vaudreuil, highly cultured and possessed of great charm and fascination for women, also had a violent temper and ambitious nature.

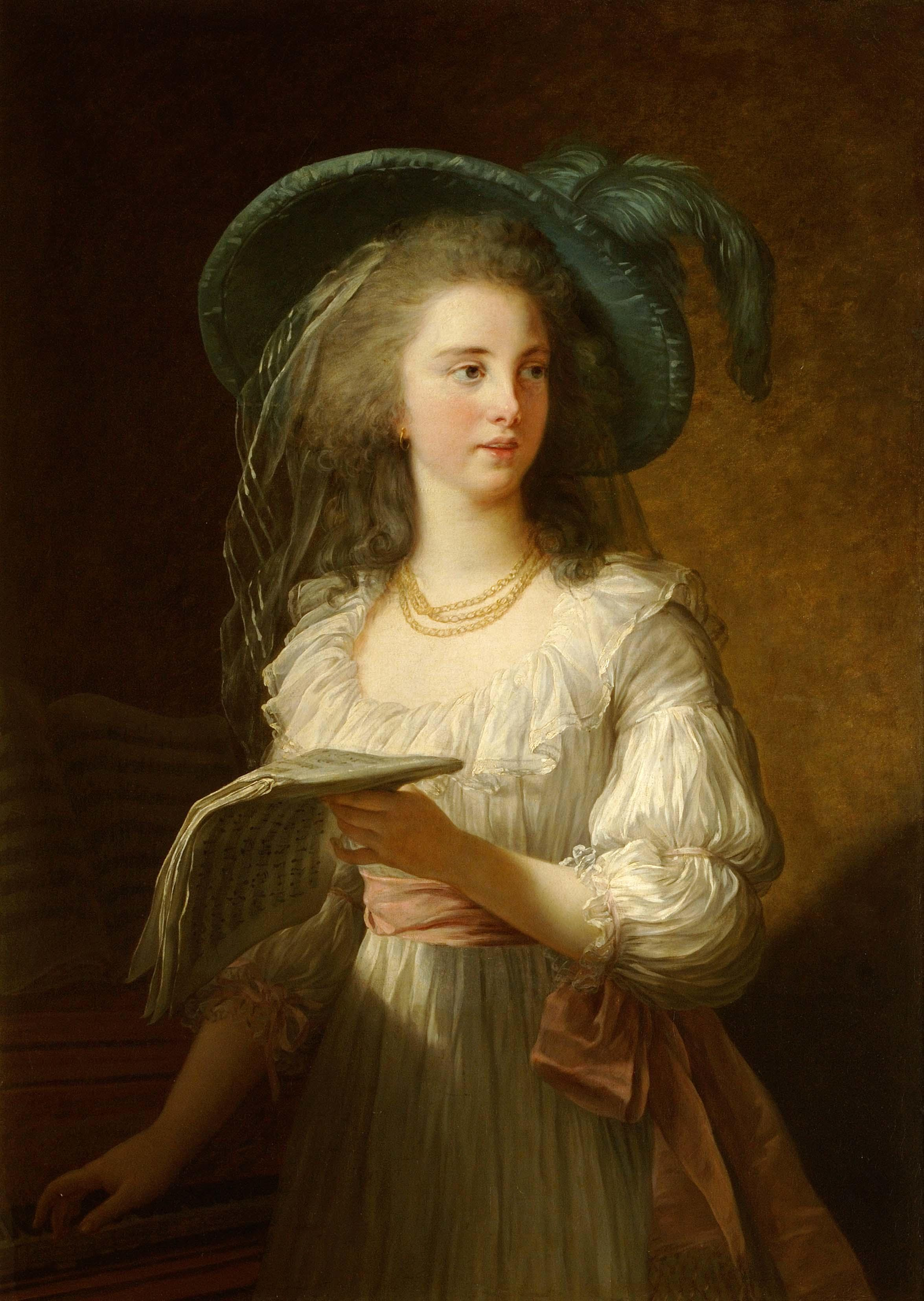
Gabrielle de Polastron, duchesse de Polignac, alleged mistress of the Comte de Vaudreuil

Capitalising on Gabrielle's indifference to what she saw as the vulgar matter of intriguing, Vaudreuil insinuated his way into her inner circle. He quickly became head of a notorious côterie of courtiers, sycophants, and relations of the Polignacs who surrounded the Queen. This coterie soon turned into a cabal which constantly sought positions, favours, and pensions for themselves and their ambitious relatives. Vaudreuil made his mistake in assuming that Queen Marie-Antoinette's close friendship with Gabrielle would automatically make her amenable to his ambitious demands. However, the Queen despised the Count and she complained of him to several of her ladies-in-waiting, including Madame Campan, who recalled the Queen's fury when Vaudreuil broke one of her ivory billiard cues in a fit of temper at losing a game. Thus Vaudreuil never obtained a position at Court higher than that of royal falconer; a post which earned him 30,000 livres a year. This was not enough to satisfy the ambitious Count who dreamed of becoming minister of the king's household. The Abbé de Vermond, the Queen's confessor and spiritual adviser, shrewdly advised her not to appoint him; thereby Vermond incurred the hatred of the entire Polignac clan, with the curious exception of Gabrielle, who remained silent on the matter.

On 14 May 1780, Gabrielle gave birth to a son, Jules de Polignac whom everyone at Court whispered had been fathered by Vaudreuil and not her husband. King Louis XVI and the Queen did not believe the child was Vaudreuil's and the King took the unprecedented step of publicly visiting the new baby in a vain attempt to quash the rumours.

== The Marriage of Figaro ==
In July 1783, Vaudreuil, a talented amateur actor, encouraged the Queen to allow the public performance of The Marriage of Figaro written by his friend, the noted liberal Pierre Beaumarchais. He himself played the part of Almaviva in a Court performance. This was a blatant satire against the institution of monarchy, the government, and French society in general, and it proved to be highly incendiary. Louis XVI refused to yield to pressure and had the play censored.

By now, Gabrielle had apparently decided that Vaudreuil was beginning to weaken her own position as a leader of aristocratic society and her friendship with the Queen. She began to avoid him and in 1785, she abruptly left Paris to spend time visiting friends in London. Her visits to spas in order to take the waters in the company of the Duchess of Devonshire became more prolonged and, by 1786, she saw Vaudreuil on an extremely rare basis and almost never without other people around her.

== Departure ==
Following the storming of the Bastille on 14 July 1789, which marked the beginning of the French Revolution, Vaudreuil, in the company of his old royal comrade, the Comte d'Artois, left Versailles on horseback for the Austrian Netherlands. He would spend the next twenty-five years organising a counter-revolution. Gabrielle de Polastron left the country separately, settling in Switzerland, where she made no effort to contact Vaudreuil or inquire after his whereabouts. She died in 1793, following a prolonged battle with either cancer or consumption. Her behaviour in the last few years is crucially cited by those historians who reject the idea that she was ever actually sexually or romantically involved with Vaudreuil, but rather tolerated his larger-than-life personality and extravagances until he became too aggressive and too much of a threat to her own position at Versailles. He did not attend her funeral in Austria.

Later he moved to England, where in 1795 he married his cousin Louis-Philippe's daughter, Marie Joséphine de Rigaud de Vaudreuil (1774–1859). Two sons were born to them: Charles (1796–1880) and Victor (1798–1834). After the fall of the First French Empire he returned to France where King Louis XVIII appointed him Governor of the Tuileries.

Vaudreuil died in 1817 in Paris at the age of seventy-seven.

== In art ==
In 1784, the celebrated artist Élisabeth-Louise Vigée-Le Brun painted two portraits of Vaudreuil. He was one of Vigée-Lebrun's most devoted patrons, and owned many of her works in his vast private art collection, which included a portrait of Gabrielle de Polignac. Some have speculated that the friendship between Élisabeth and the comte was not strictly platonic. Had an affair taken place, it would also have taken place at the same time some have argued he was sexually involved with the duchesse de Polignac, an unlikely development given Gabrielle's exalted sense of her own importance. The existence of one affair would in all probability negate the likelihood of the other.
