= Portrait of Madame de Pompadour =

Painting by François Boucher

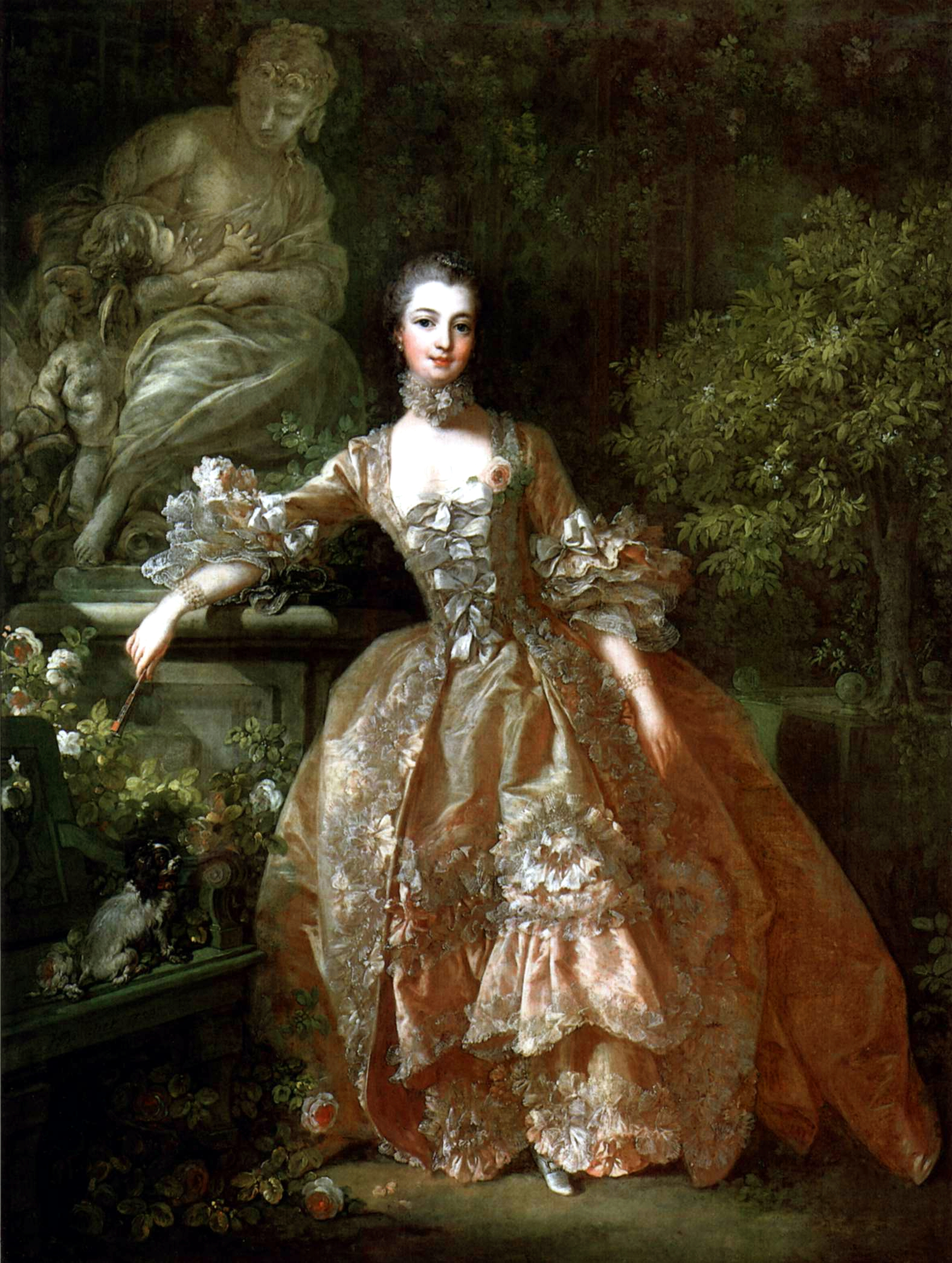
- Artist: François Boucher
- Year: 1759
- Medium: oil on canvas
- Dimensions: 91 cm × 68 cm (36 in × 27 in)
- Location: Wallace Collection, London

Portrait of Madame de Pompadour is a 1759 oil-on-canvas painting by the French Rococo artist François Boucher, now in the Wallace Collection in London. It was the last of a series of seven portraits by the artist of Madame de Pompadour. It was first exhibited at the Château de Versailles before passing to the subject's brother.
