= Hubert Drouais =

French painter (1699–1767)

- Born: 5 May 1699; Pont-Audemer, Normandy, France
- Died: 9 February 1767 (aged 67); Paris, France
- Spouse: Margaret Lusurier (m. 1727)
- Children: Francois-Hubert and 1 other
- Parent(s): Anne Talon; Jean Drouais

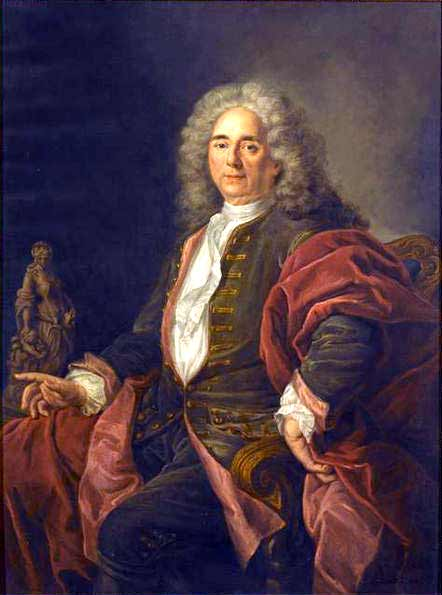
Portrait of the sculptor Robert Le Lorrain, by Drouais, c. 1730, Paris, Musée du Louvre

Hubert Drouais (French: [ybɛʁ dʁwɛ]; 5 May 1699 – 9 February 1767) was a French painter, portraitist, and miniaturist.

Drouais was born in Pont-Audemer,Normandy, the son of Anne Talon and the painter Jean Drouais. Hubert followed in his father’s footsteps and received his first lessons from him before leaving for Rouen to further his skills. He then decided to make it to Paris, although he was so poor that, unable to afford the cost of the trip, he had to work his way on the road to his destination.

He devoted himself particularly to the portrait, and was the best pupil of the portraitist François Troy, who is linked through his own master and through Rigaud to the grand tradition of Anthony Dyck. He soon acquired an ease that made him look like one of the first painters in this genre. As he was making progress, he would visit his homeland, as if to honor it with his first successes. His father’s approval and his countrymen’s encouragement were his rewards. He was involved in the genres of portraiture and miniature.

On the death of Troy, Drouais was employed by Jean-Baptiste Loo, Jean-Baptiste Oudry and Jean-Marc Nattier. He was in fashion at the court of Louis XV as a portraitist, painting not only princes and princesses, but the actresses of Comédie-Française and opera girls, like the Camargo, Mlle Gautier, Mlle Pelissier, the Gaussin, as well.

Drouais was received at the Académie de peinture et de sculpture on November 29, 1730. At his death, rue des Orties, his funeral was celebrated at the Église Saint-Roch. He had two children with Margaret Lusurier whom he had married on February 22, 1727. His son François-Hubert, whose first master he was, and his grandson Jean Drouais were painters like him and in his old age he had the satisfaction to see his son also enter the Académie de peinture. He died in Paris.

== Works ==
- Robert le Lorrain (1666–1743)
- Mademoiselle Marie Pelissier
- Joseph Christophe (1662–1748)
- Mademoiselle Gauthier, 1737
- Madame de France, 1741
- Monsieur le Vicomte de Courtenier, 1741
- Madame la Vicomtesse de Courtenier, 1741
- Madame Héry
- Madame Courgy
- Mademoiselle Gossin tenant un livre, 1746
- Mademoiselle Drouais, sa fille, tenant un chat, 1746
- Le Fils de l’auteur, 1746
- Monsieur Jacquemain tenant un crayon, 1746
- Mademoiselle ***, 1746
- Mademoiselle *** tenant des fleurs, 1746
- Demoiselle qui rit, 1746
- La Camargo.
- The Dauphin Louis de Bourbon, Ca. 1744.

== Bibliography ==
- (in French) C. Gabillot, « Les Trois Drouais », in Gazette des Beaux-Arts, vol. II; 1906, vol. I, 1905.
- Klingsöhr-Leroy, Cathrin (2003). "Drouais, Hubert [Drouais le père]". Grove Art Online.
