= François-Hubert Drouais =

French painter (1727–1775)

- Born: 14 December 1727; Paris, France
- Died: 21 October 1775 (aged 47); Paris, France
- Children: Jean-Germain Drouais
- Father: Hubert Drouais
- Elected: Académie royale de peinture et de sculpture
- Patrons: Hubert Drouais; Donat Nonnotte; Charles-André van Loo; Charles-Joseph Natoire

François-Hubert Drouais (French pronunciation: [fʁɑ̃swa ybɛʁ dʁuɛ]; Paris, 14 December 1727 – Paris, 21 October 1775) was a leading French portrait painter during the latter years of Louis XV's reign.

His clientele included the French royal family and nobility, foreign aristocracy, fermiers-généraux (tax farmers), and the wealthier members of Parisian society and their favourites. But it was his increasing popularity at the French court that expanded his clientele and made his portraits a fashionable necessity. Drouais's work was admired during his lifetime, and his popularity and clientele did not diminish from the occasional adverse judgement published in Salon reviews.

Drouais was apprenticed successively to his father Hubert Drouais, Donat Nonnotte, Charles-André van Loo, Charles-Joseph Natoire, and François Boucher. He was received into the Académie royale in 1758 with his morceaux des réception portraits of the celebrated sculptors Edme Bouchardon (1698–1762) and Guillaume II Coustou (1716–77). Both portraits were exhibited at the Salon of 1759 and received praise. Drouais attended the meetings of the Académie royale and, from 1755 until his death in 1775, exhibited regularly at the official Salons held in the Louvre in Paris.

Drouais was a favourite portrait painter of Jeanne Beçu, comtesse du Barry (1743–93) and, from 1772 until his death, held the position of premier peintre to Louis-Stanislas-Xavier, comte de Provence (1755–1824), known as Monsieur, later Louis XVIII. Mesdames de France, the daughters of Louis XV, were also important patrons. They recommended him to their father, Louis XV, when a portraitist was sought to travel to Vienna to paint the young Marie-Antoinette. Drouais was approached, but his commission fee was regarded as too high. Joseph Ducreux went instead.

Some of Drouais's pupils include Catherine Lusurier, his son Jean-Germain Drouais, Jean-Louis Voille, and Pierre-Hippolyte Lemoyne.

Among his portraits include those of Louis XV, Louis's official mistresses Madame de Pompadour and Madame du Barry, Mesdames de France, the comte and comtesse de Provence, the comte de Buffon, Madame Favart, and the young Marie Antoinette.

== Gallery ==
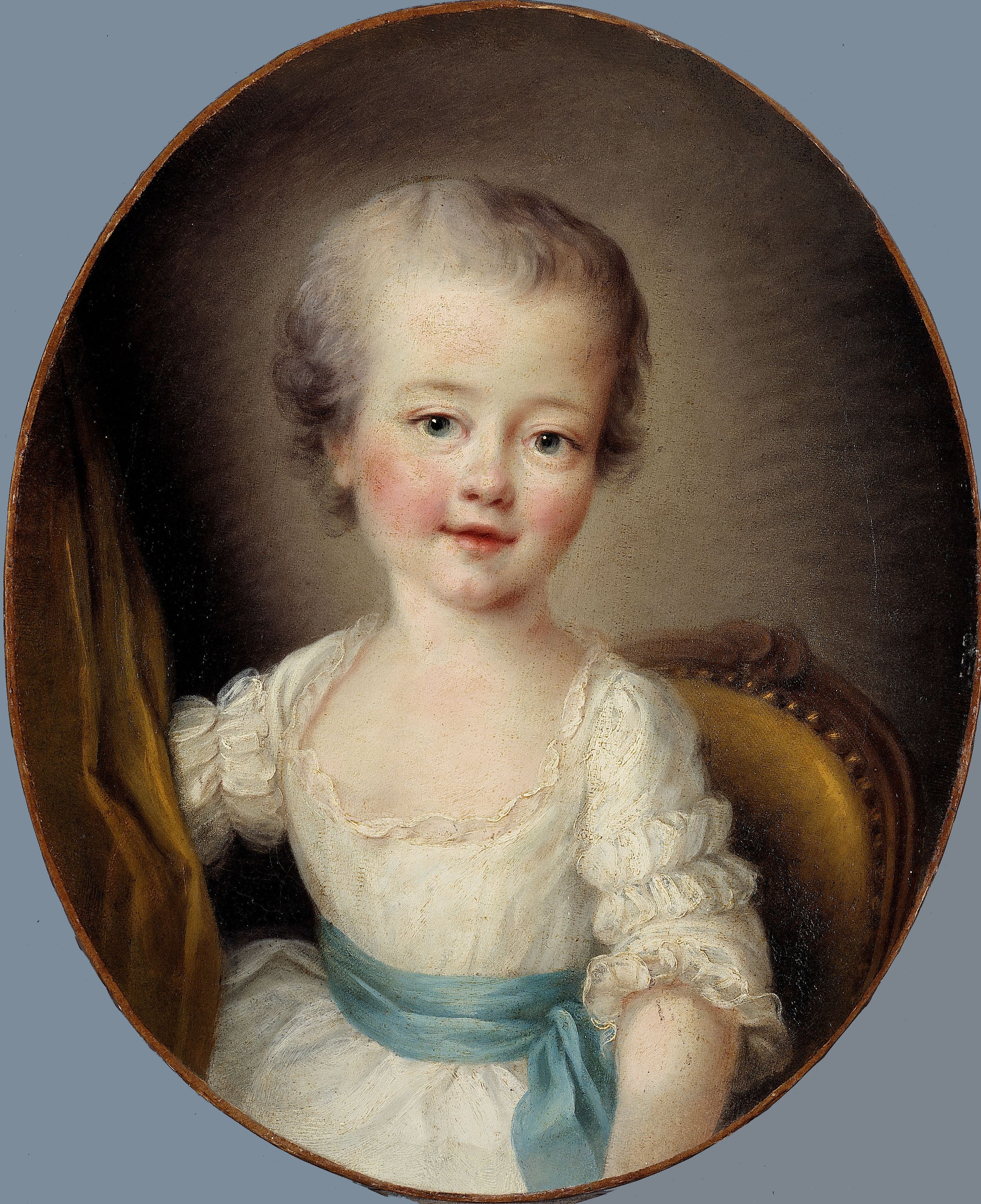
Alexandrine Le Normant d'Étiolles (1750), Musée Cognacq-Jay

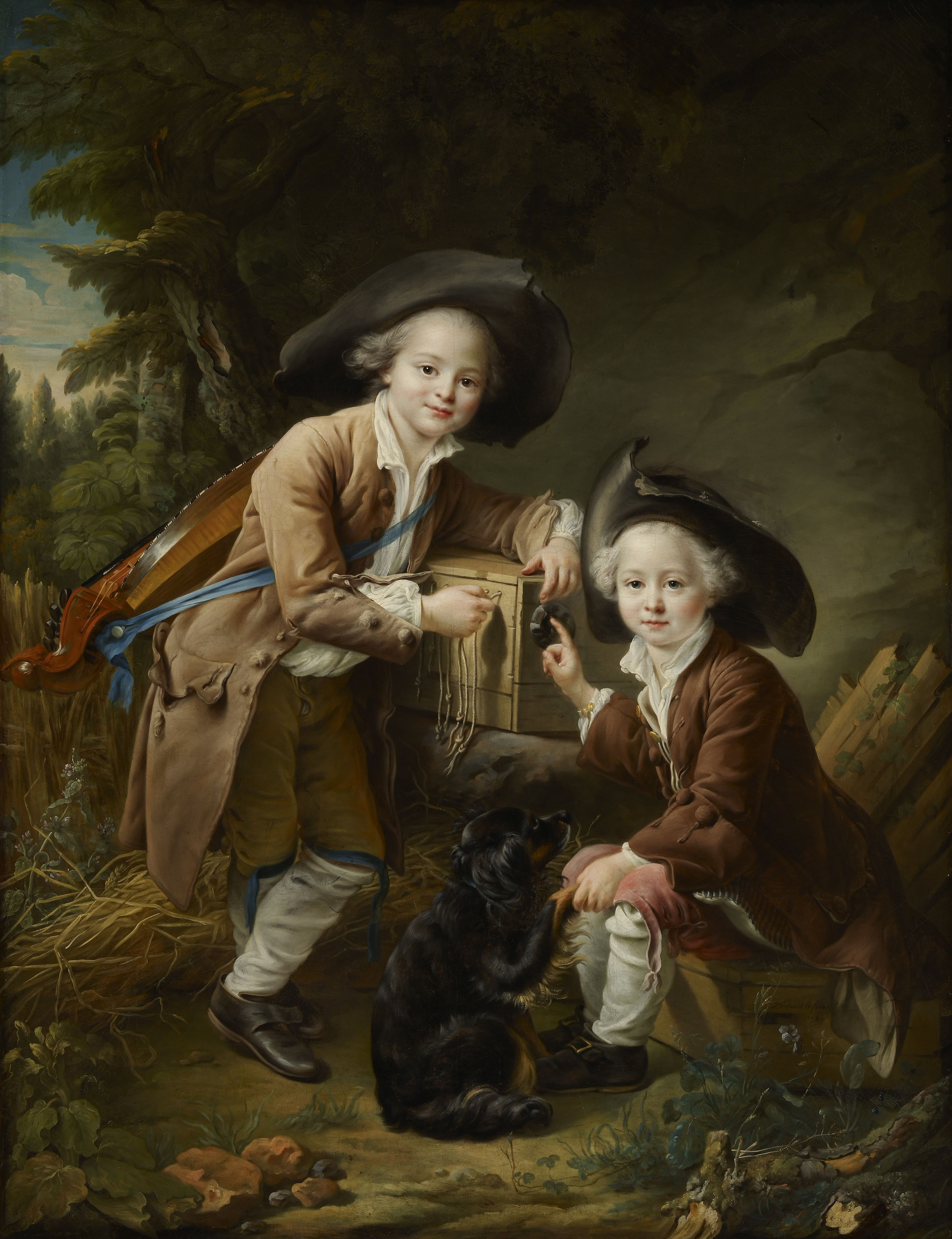
The Comte and Chevalier de Choiseul as Savoyards (1758), Frick Collection

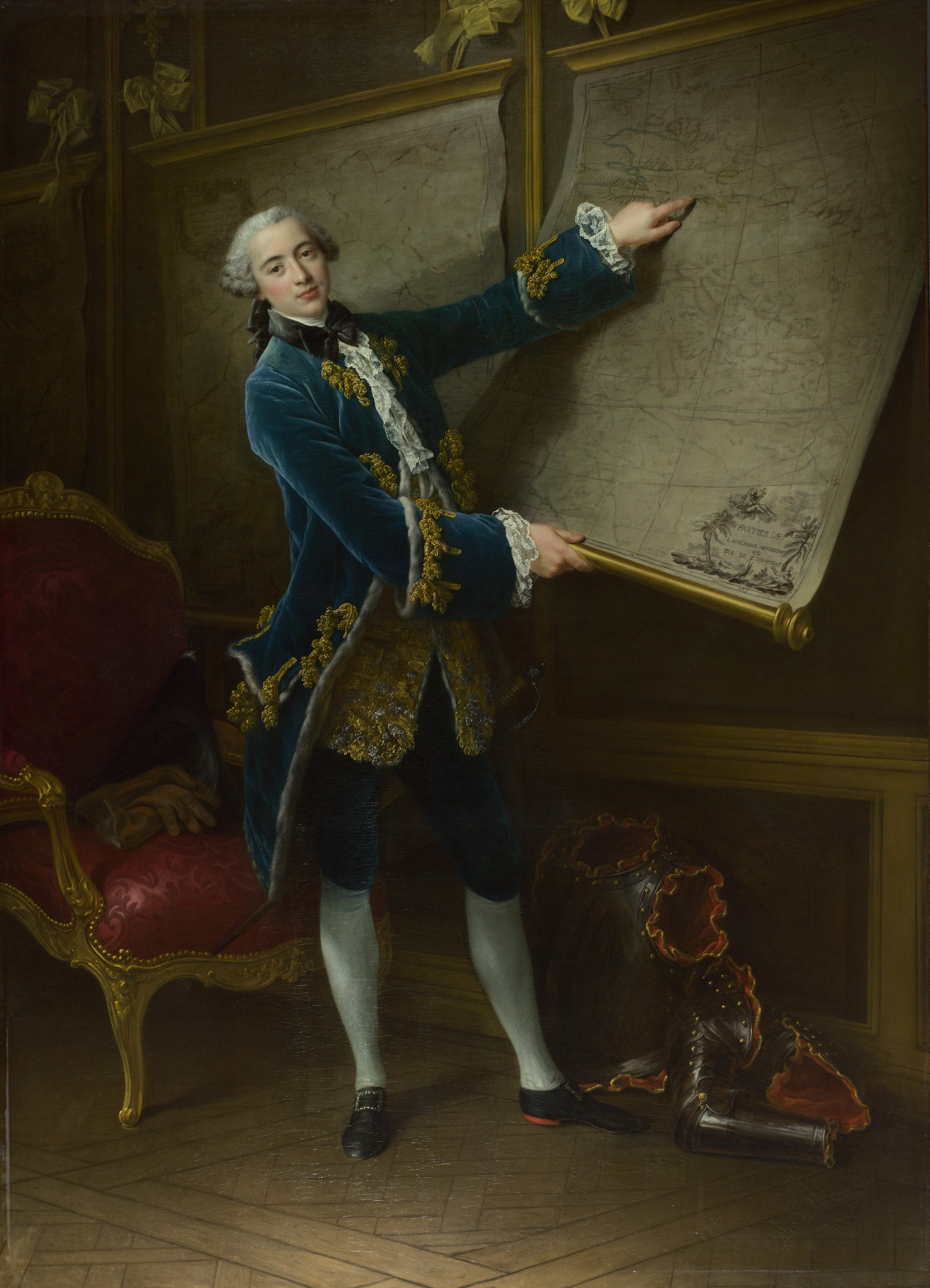
Portrait of the Comte de Vaudreuil (1758), National Gallery

Hubert Drouais, the Artist's father (ca 1760), Nationalmuseum

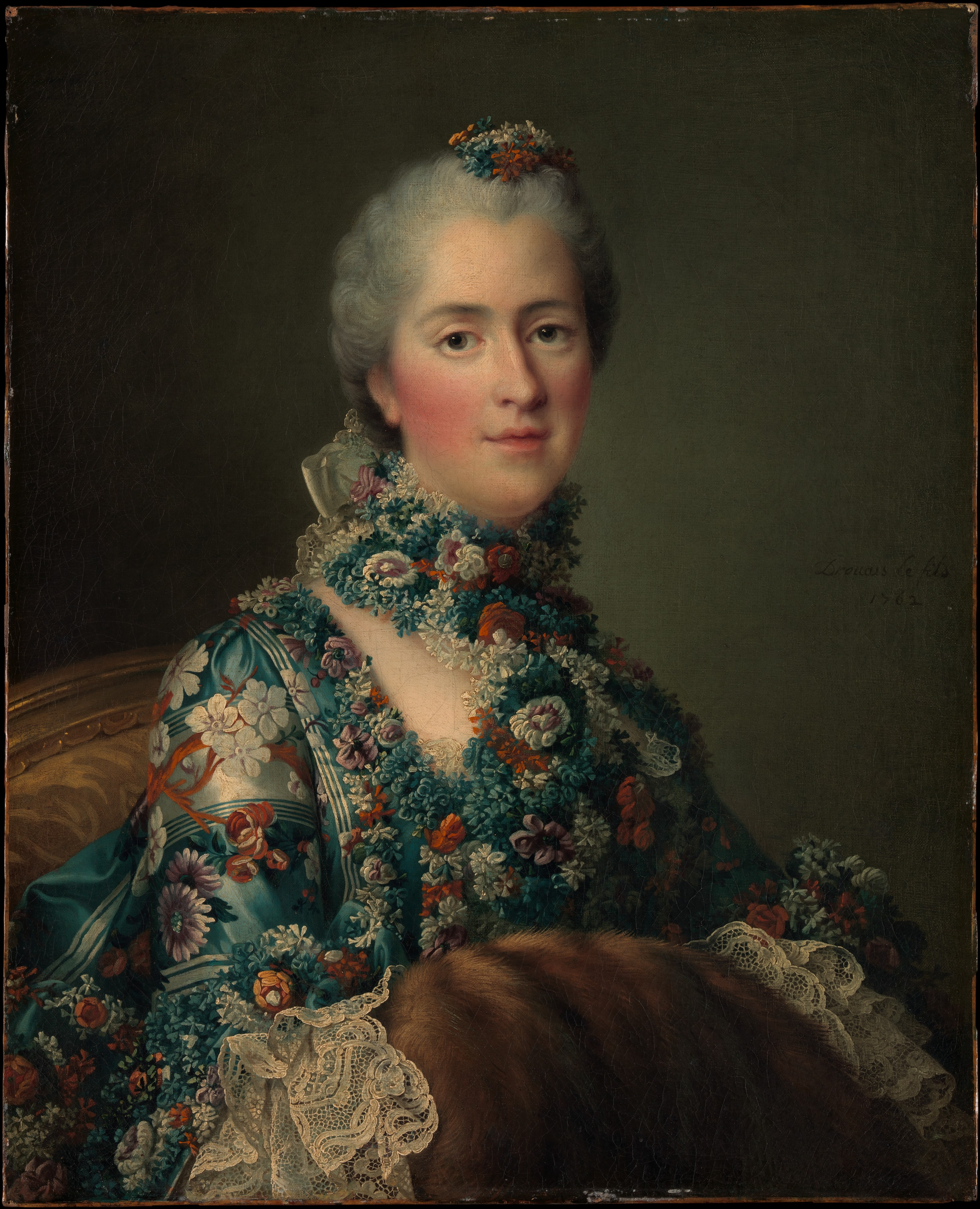
Madame Sophie de France (1762), Metropolitan Museum of Art

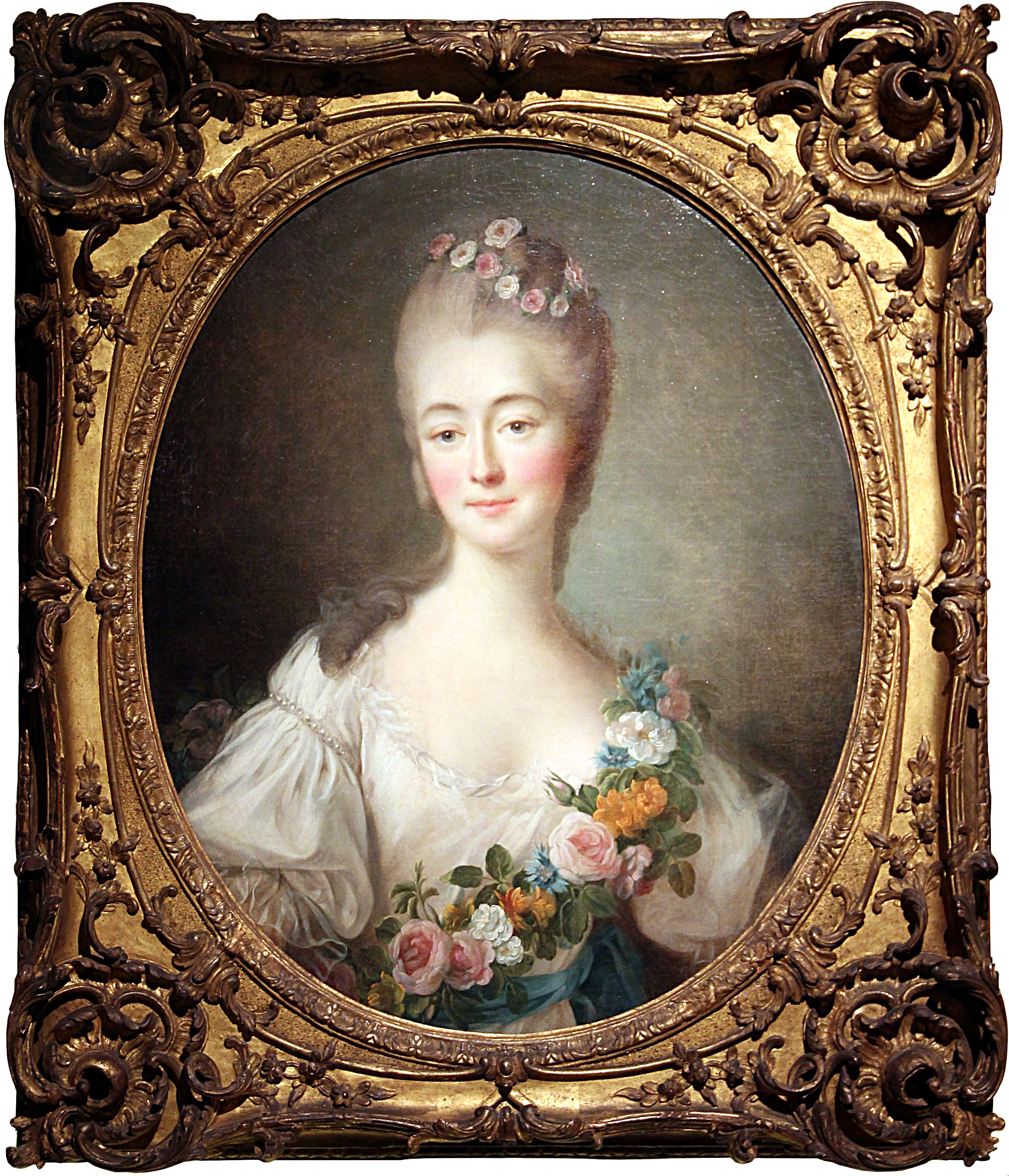
Madame du Barry (1769), Château de Versailles

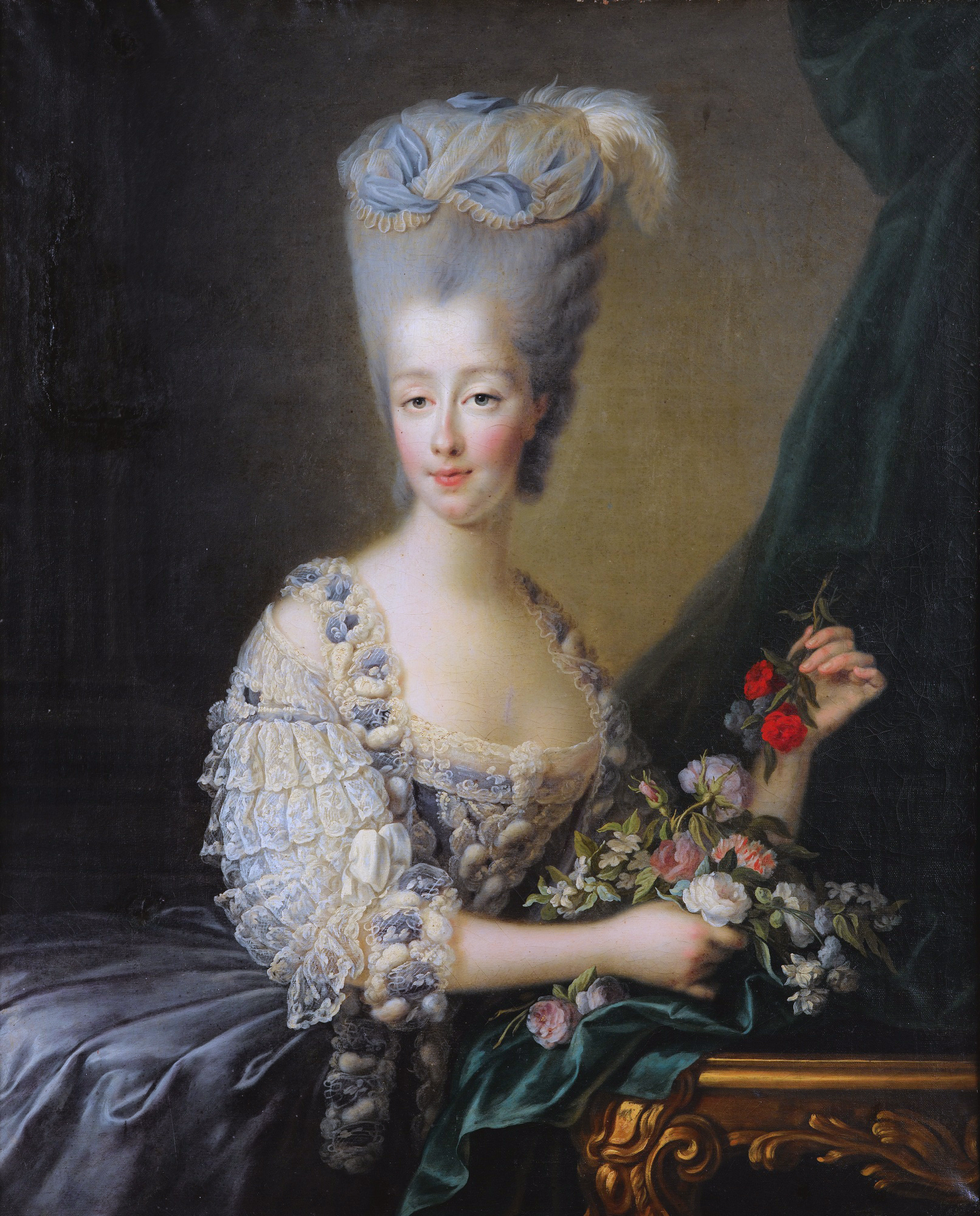
Portrait of Maria Theresa of Savoy (1775), Château de Versailles

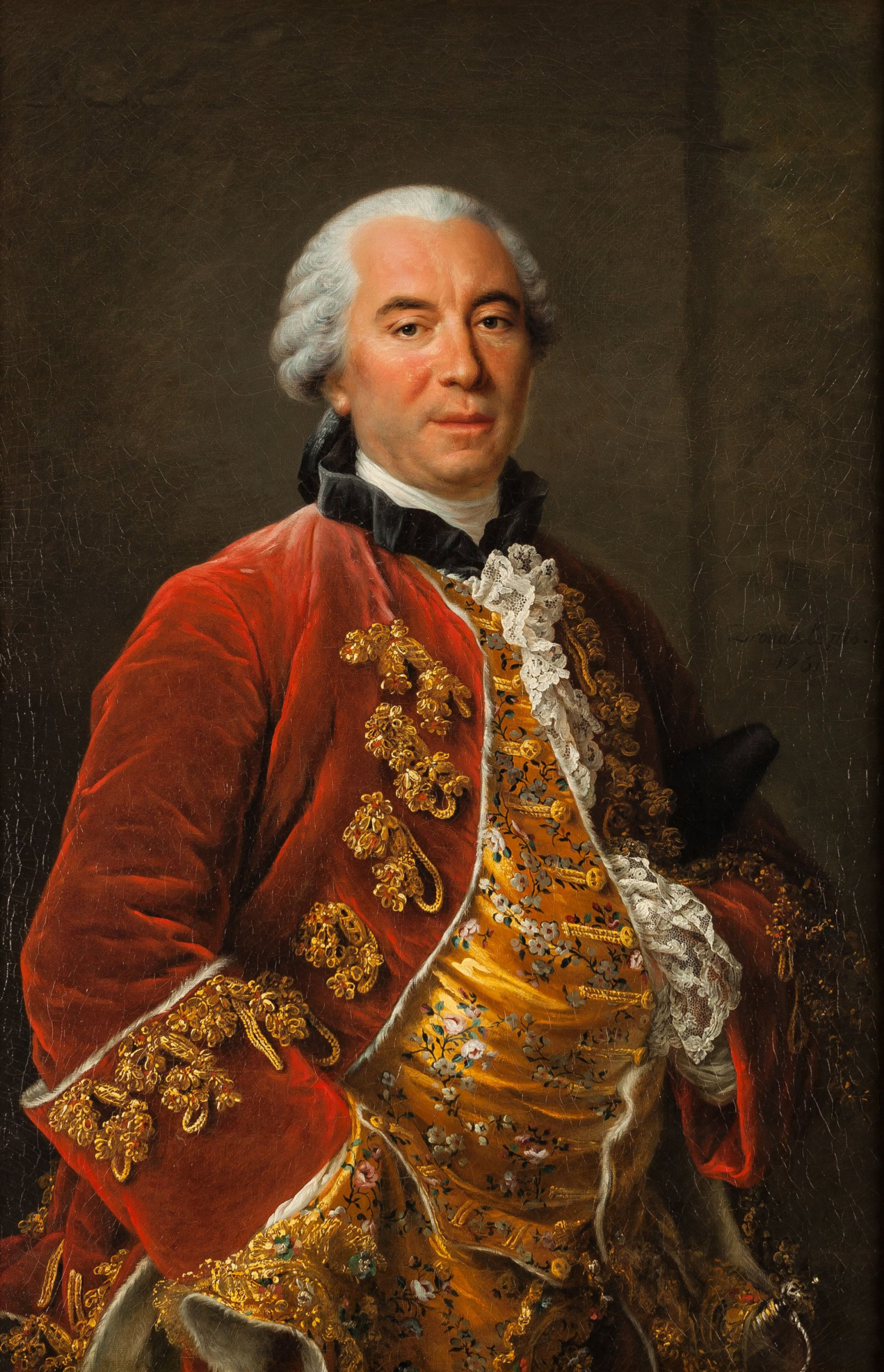
Georges-Louis Leclerc, comte de Buffon (1707–1788), Musée Buffon

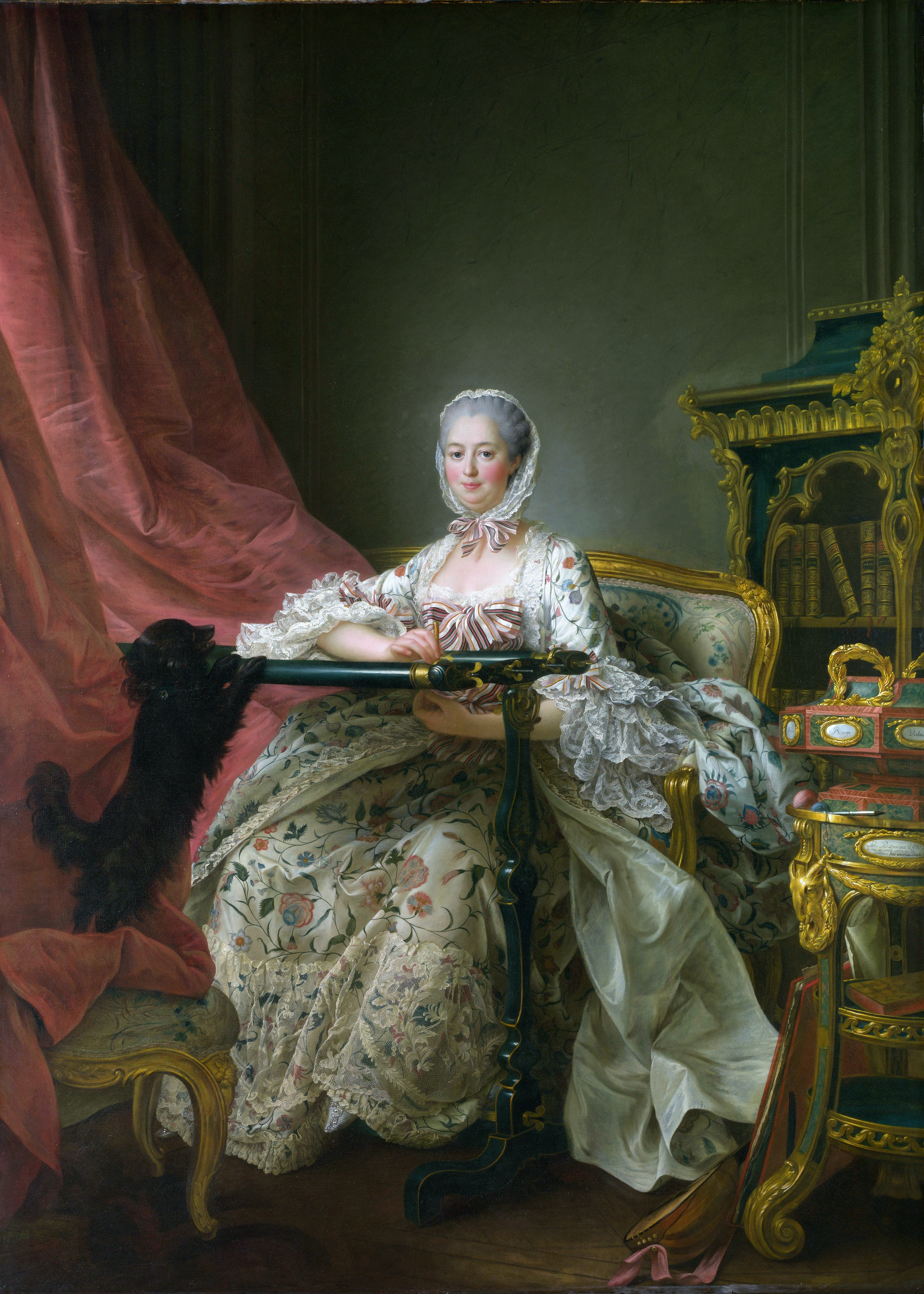
Madame de Pompadour at her Tambour Frame (1763–1764), National Gallery

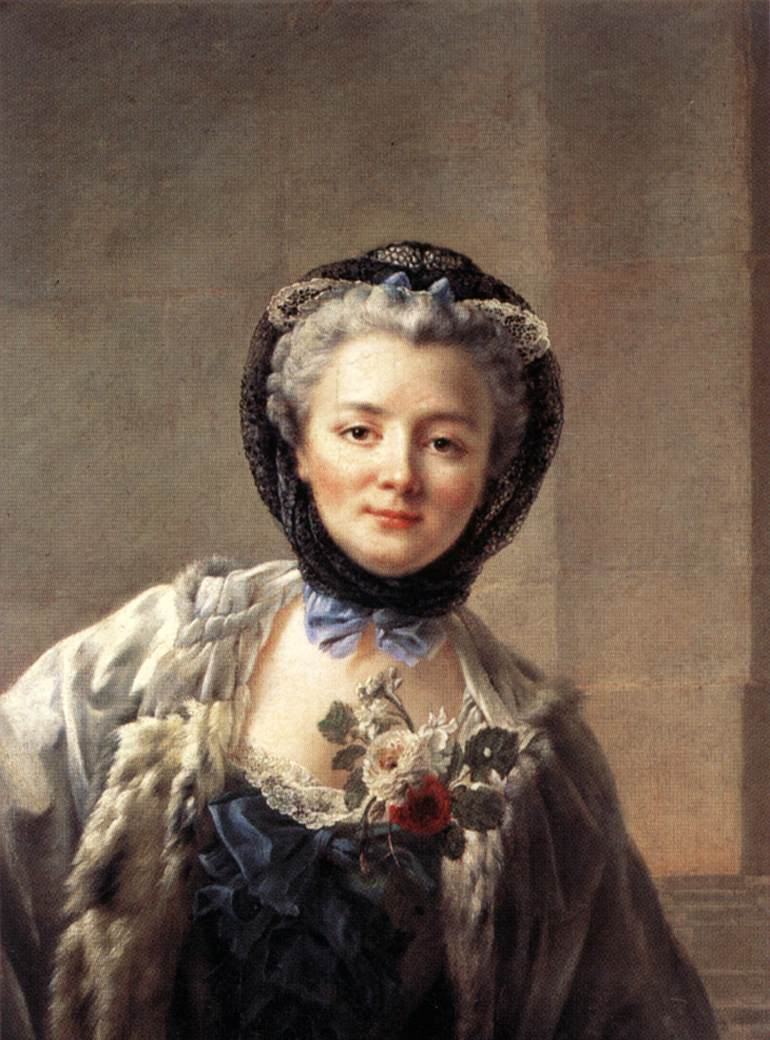
Madame Drouais (1758), Louvre Museum

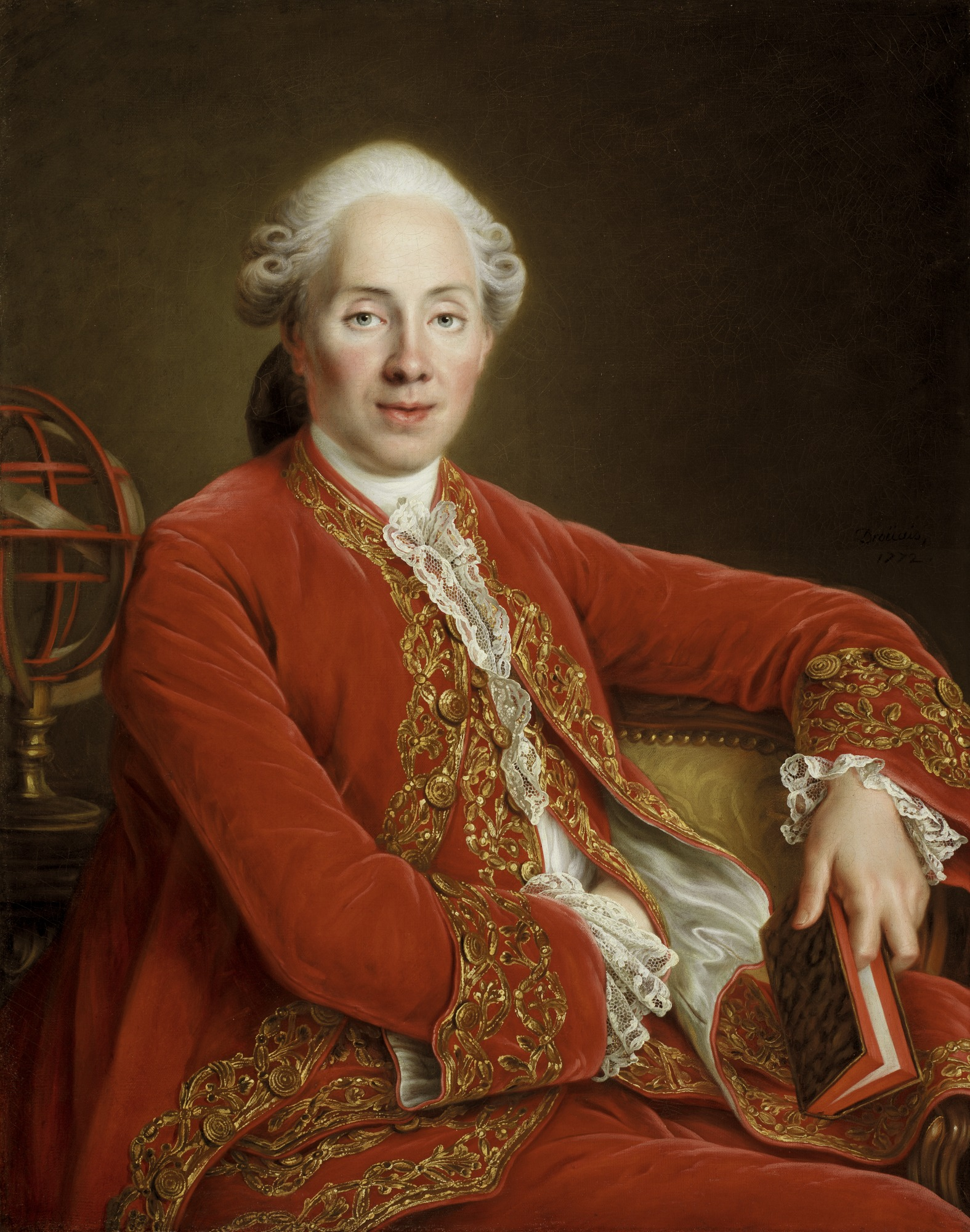
Monsieur Denis-Paul le Pot de la Fontaine (?), 1772, oil on canvas, Detroit Institute of Arts

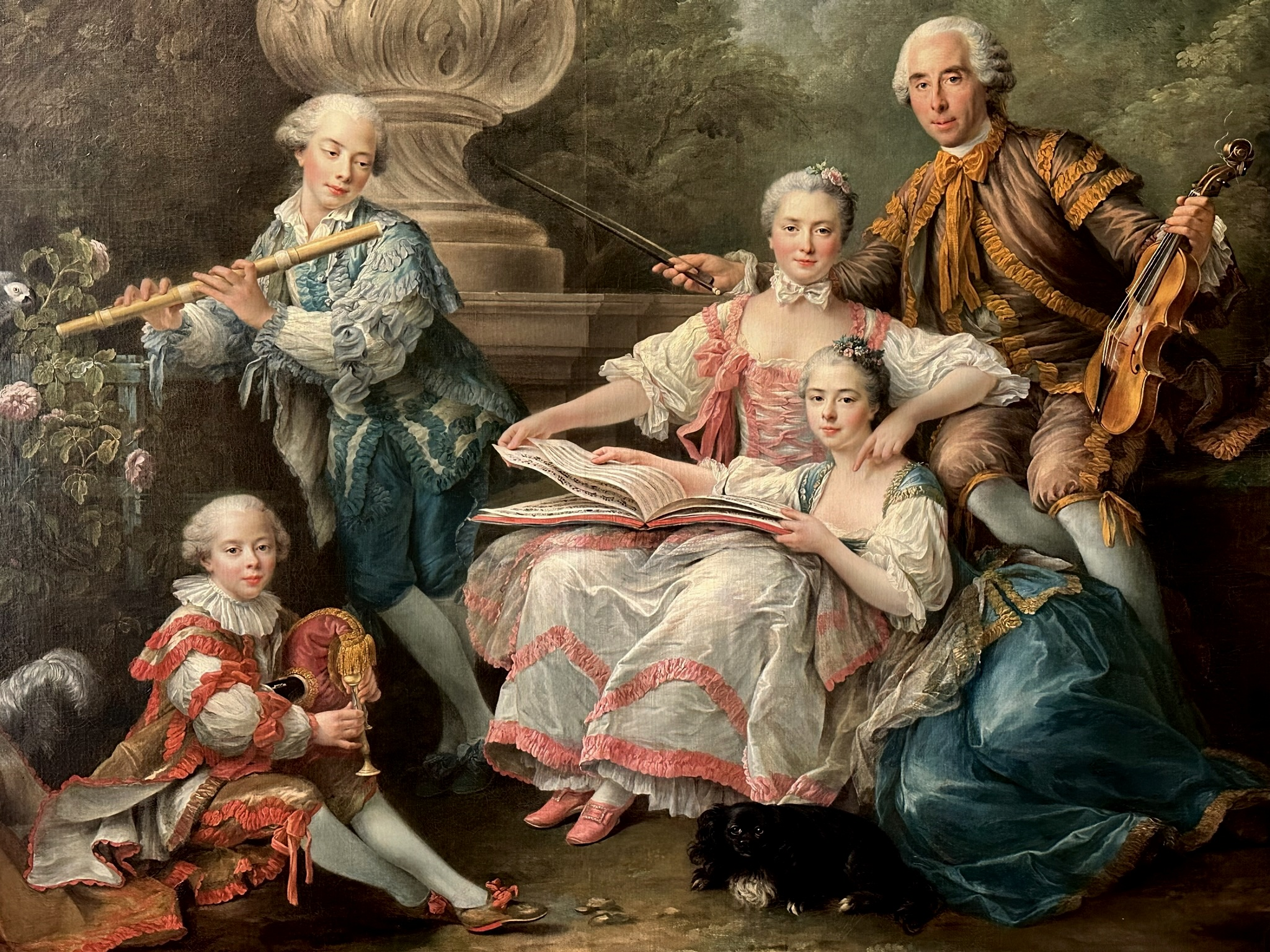
The de Sourches family (1756), Palace of Versailles

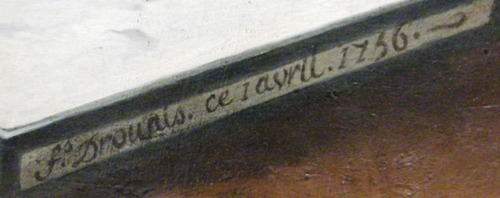
Drouais's signature in Family Portrait in the collection of the National Gallery of Art
