= Salon of 1771 =

1771 art exhibition in Paris

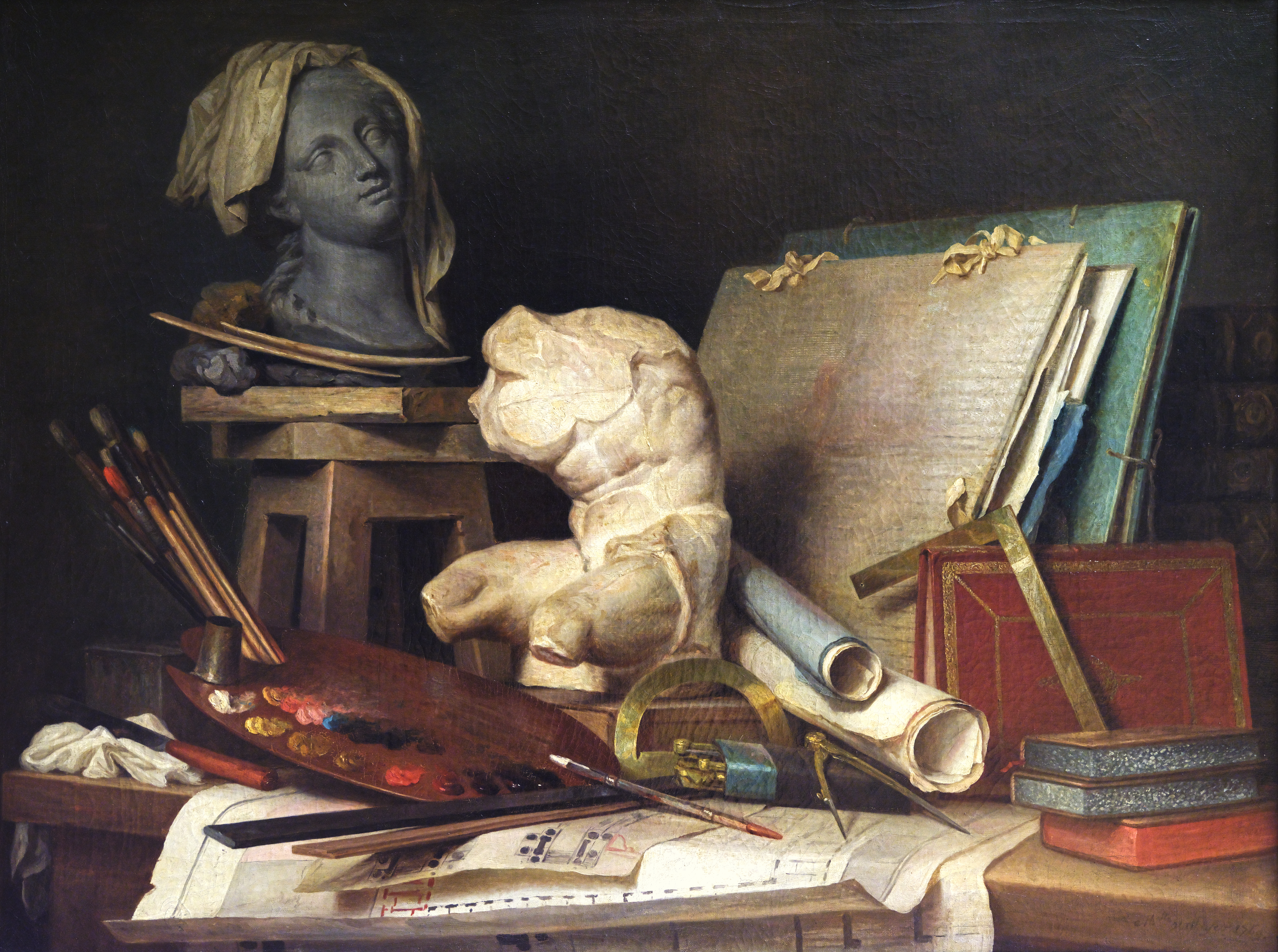
Attributes of Painting, Sculpture and Architecture by Anne Vallayer-Coster

The Salon of 1771 was an art exhibition held at the Louvre in Paris. Organised by the Académie Royale, it ran from 25 August to 23 September 1771. Taking place during the Ancien régime, it was the biannual edition of the Salon.

In portraiture François-Hubert Drouais exhibited a picture of Louis, Count of Clermont, a distant cousin of Louis XVI, known for his military service during the Seven Years' War. Guillaume Voiriot depicted the poet Charles-Pierre Colardeau. Philip James de Loutherbourg's The Little Milkmaid combined landscape and genre painting.

Jean Siméon Chardin, suffering from failing eyesight, abandoned oil painting and instead exhibited there pastel paintings including a Self-Portrait of himself with glasses. The sculptor Jean-Antoine Houdon displayed a terracotta bust of the art critic Denis Diderot. Diderot was known for his influential reviews of the Salons. Of this work he simply described it as "a good likeness".

== Gallery ==
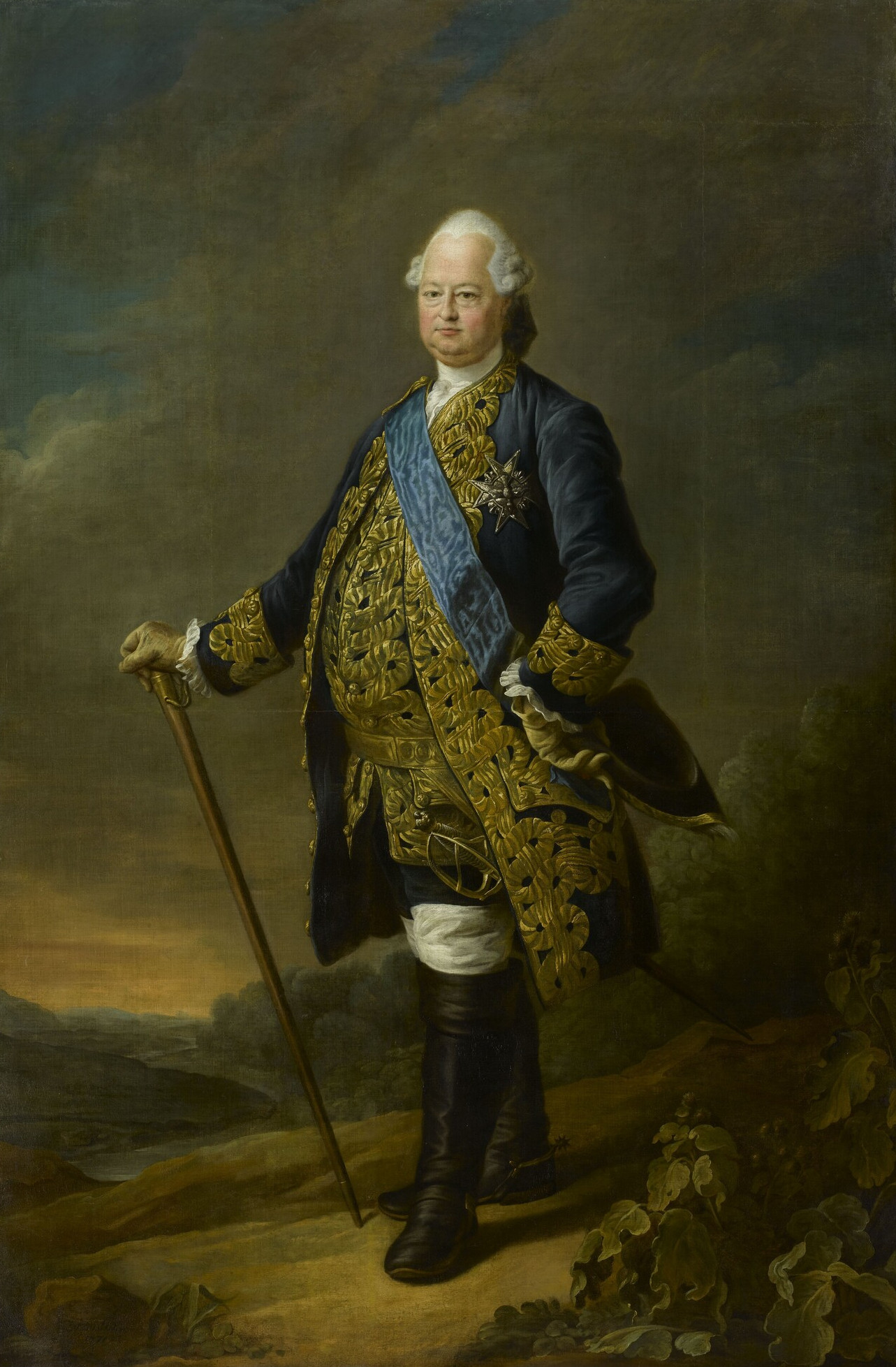
Portrait of Count of Clermont by François-Hubert Drouais

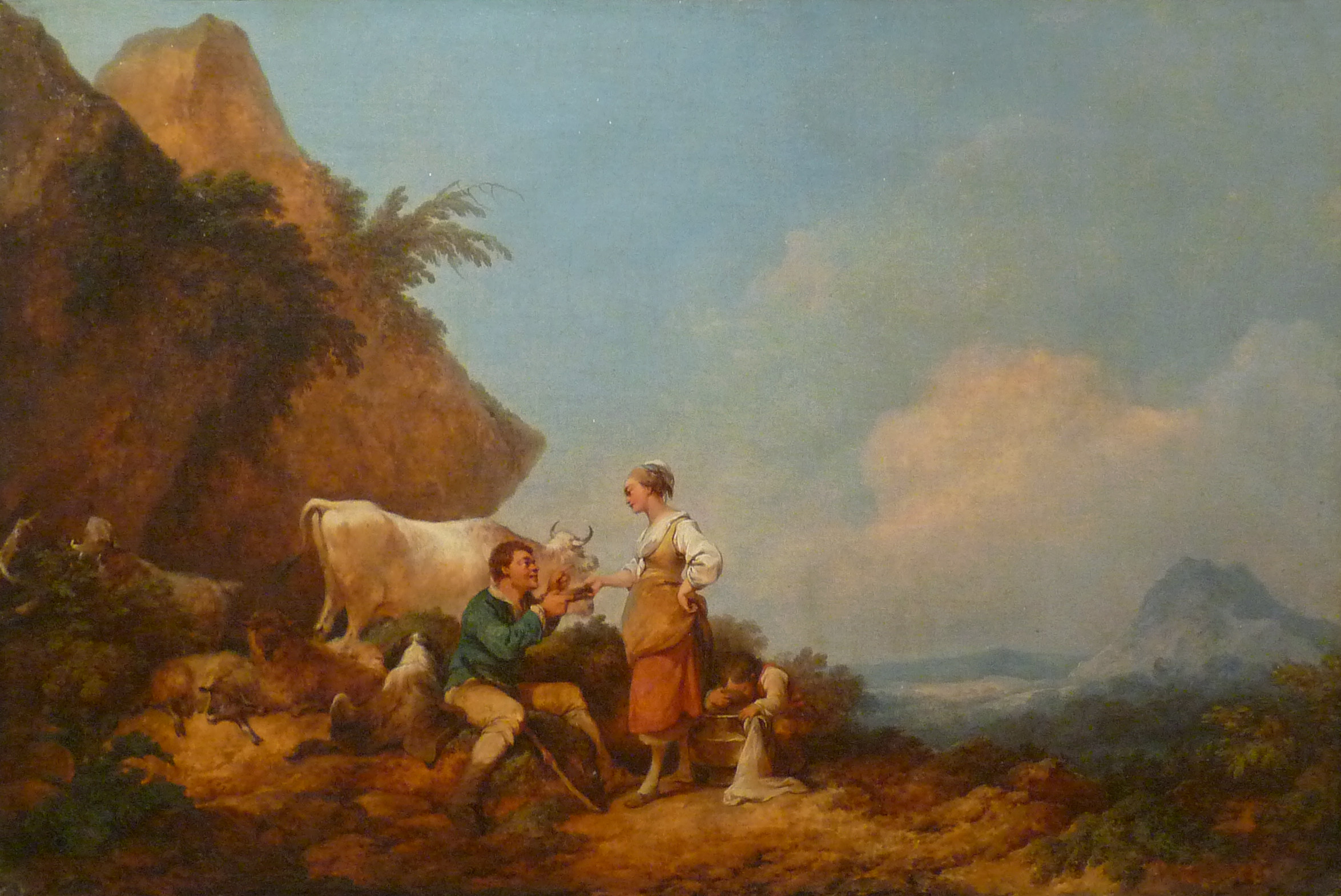
The Little Milkmaid by Philip James de Loutherbourg

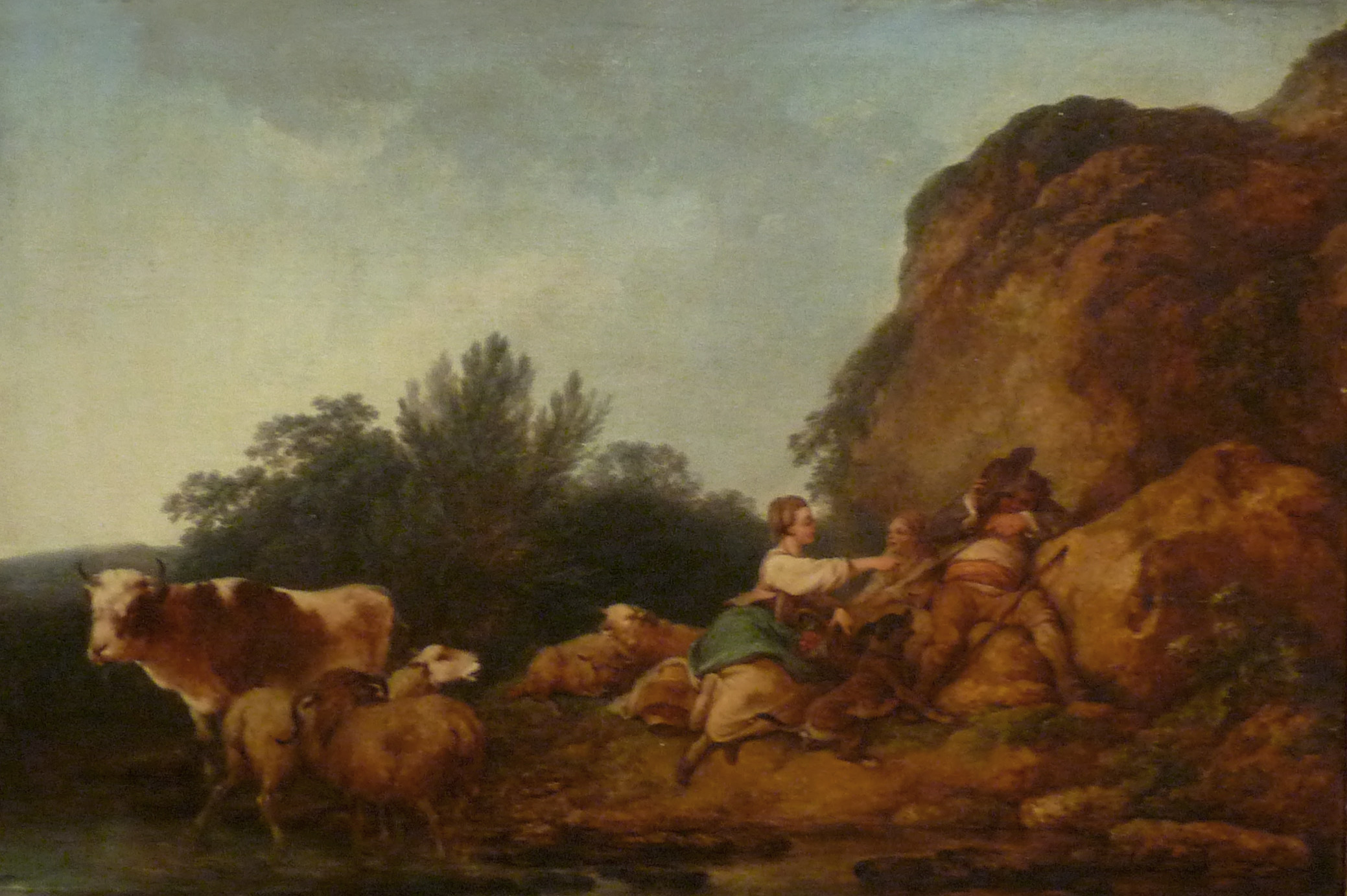
The Cherry Eater by Philip James de Loutherbourg

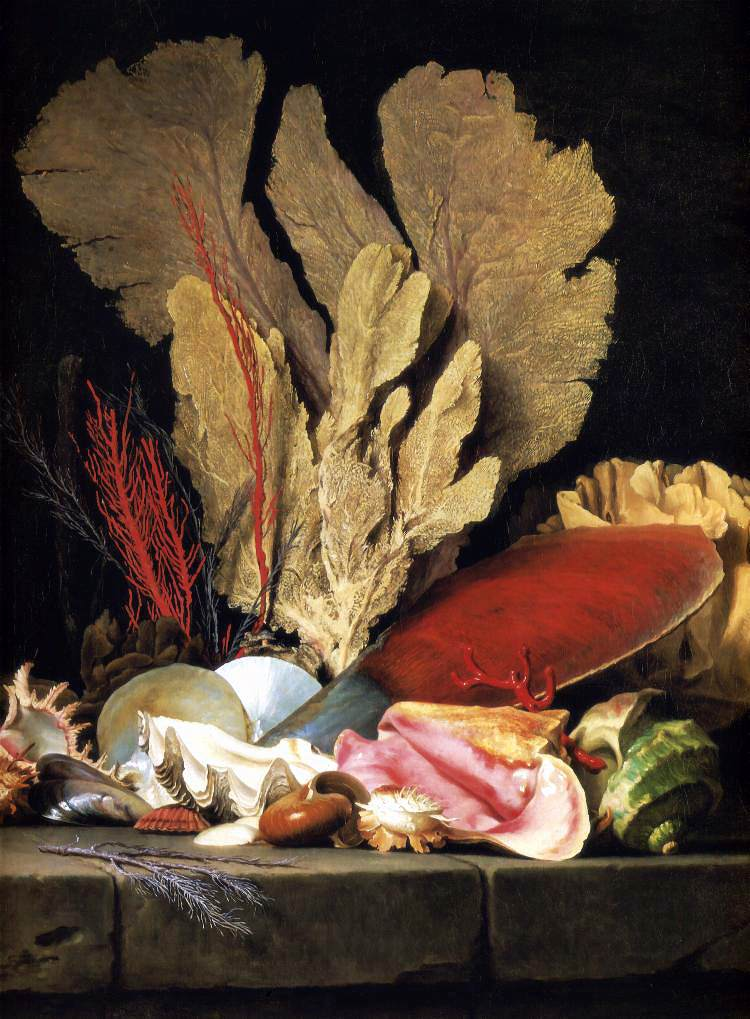
Still-Life with Marine Plants, Shells and Corals by Anne Vallayer-Coster

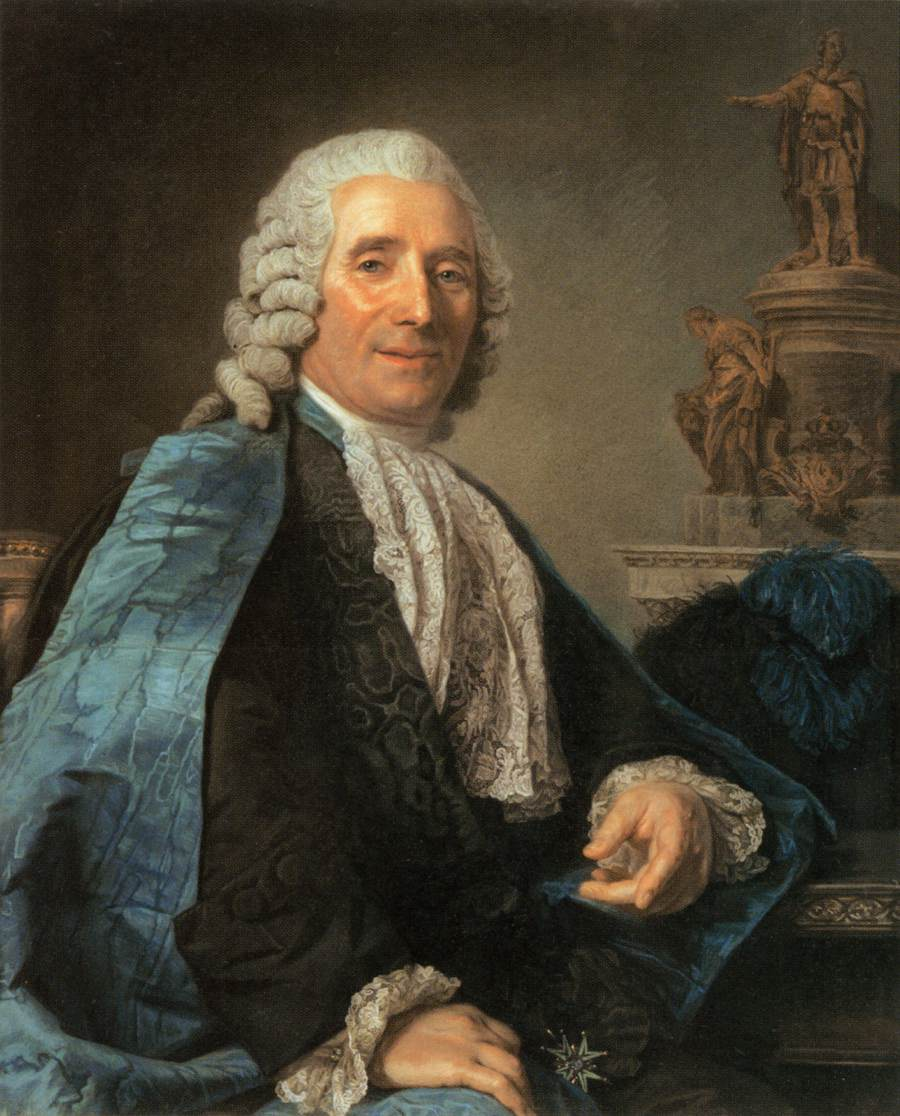
Portrait of Jean-Baptiste Pigalle by Marie-Suzanne Giroust

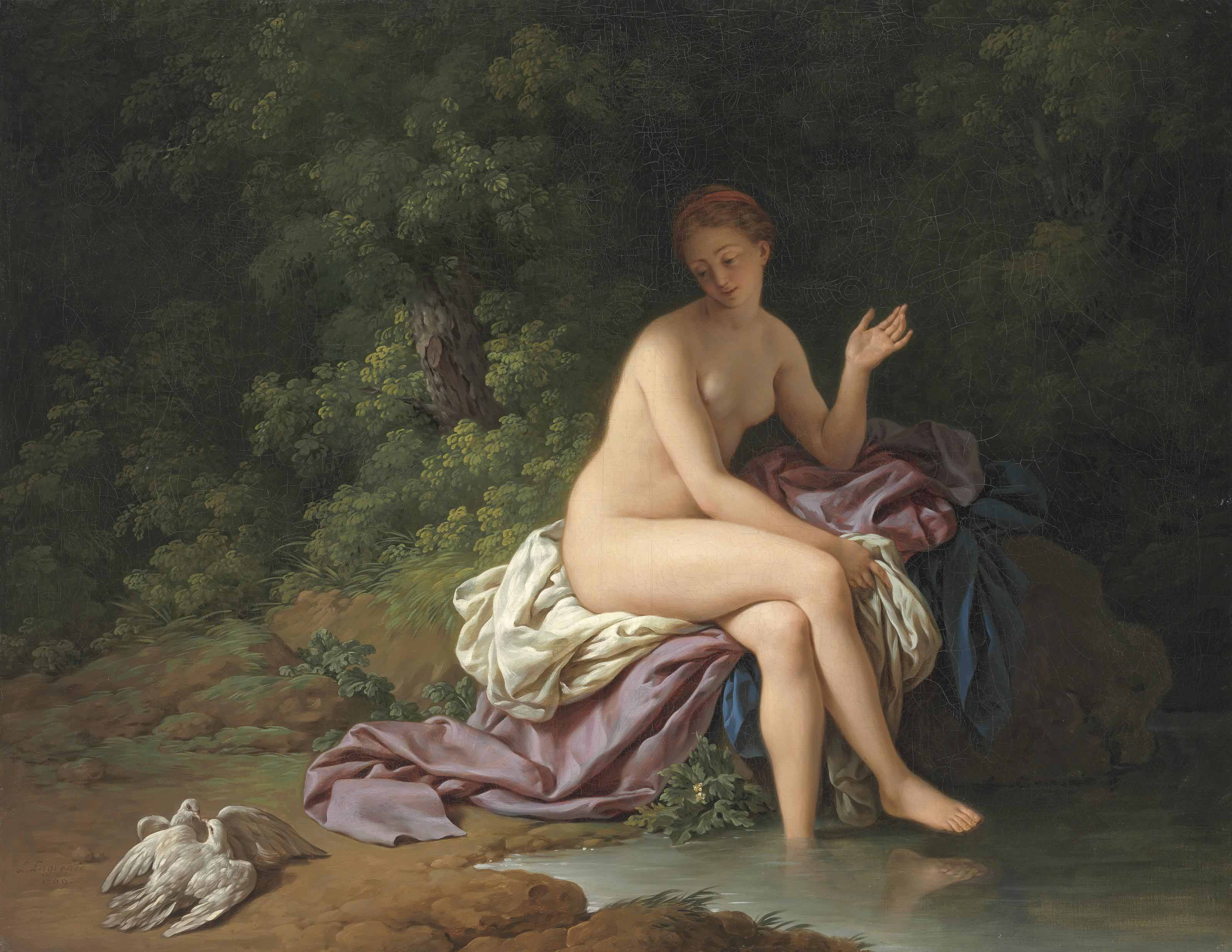
A Lady Bathing by a River with Two Doves by Louis-Jean-François Lagrenée

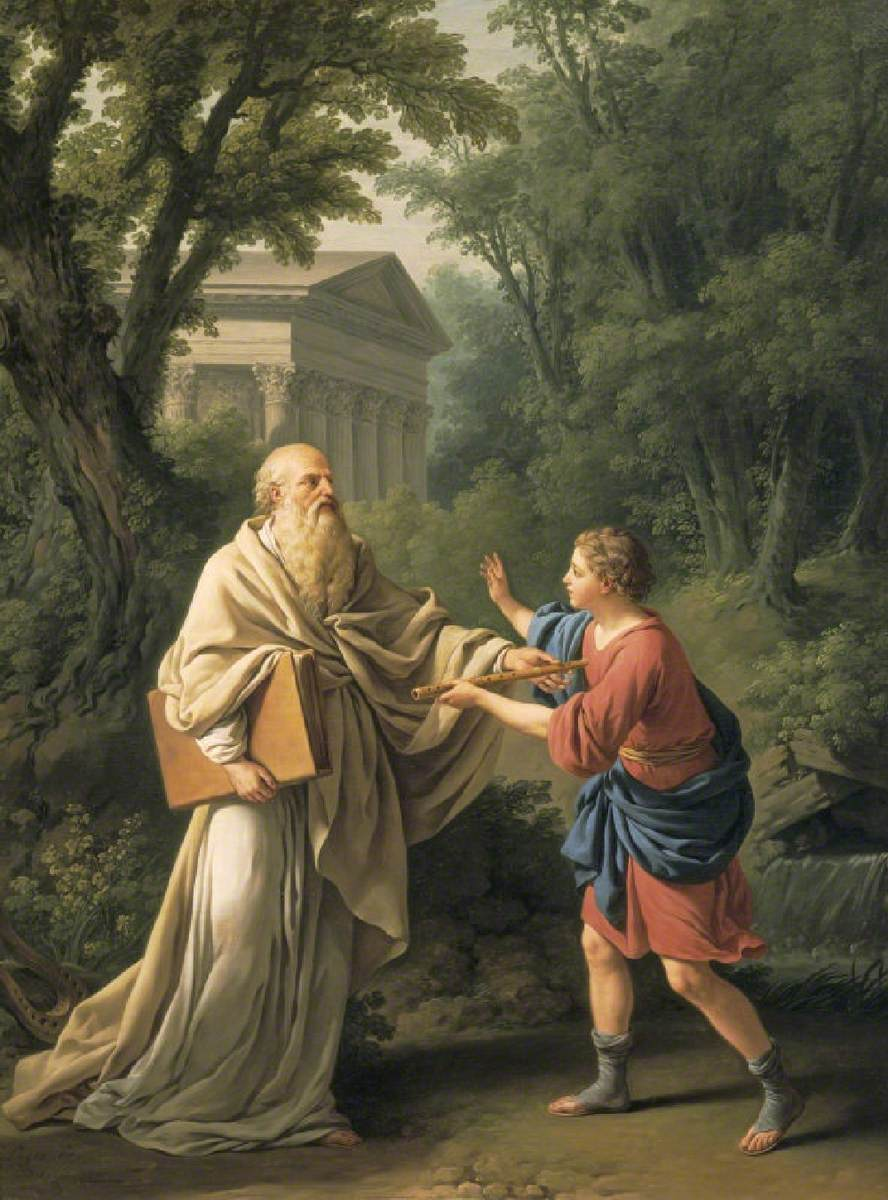
Telemachus and Thermosiris by Louis-Jean-François Lagrenée

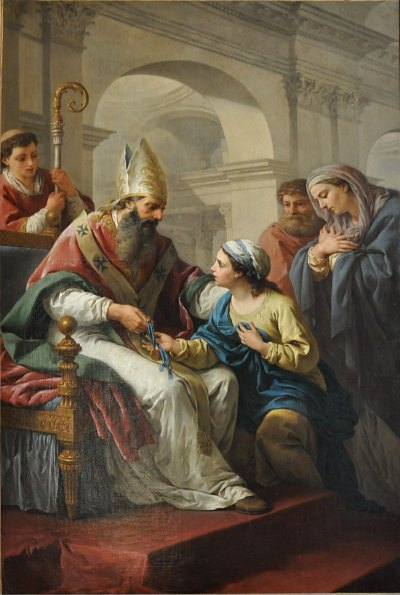
Germanus of Auxerre Giving Genevieve a Medal by Louis-Jean-François Lagrenée

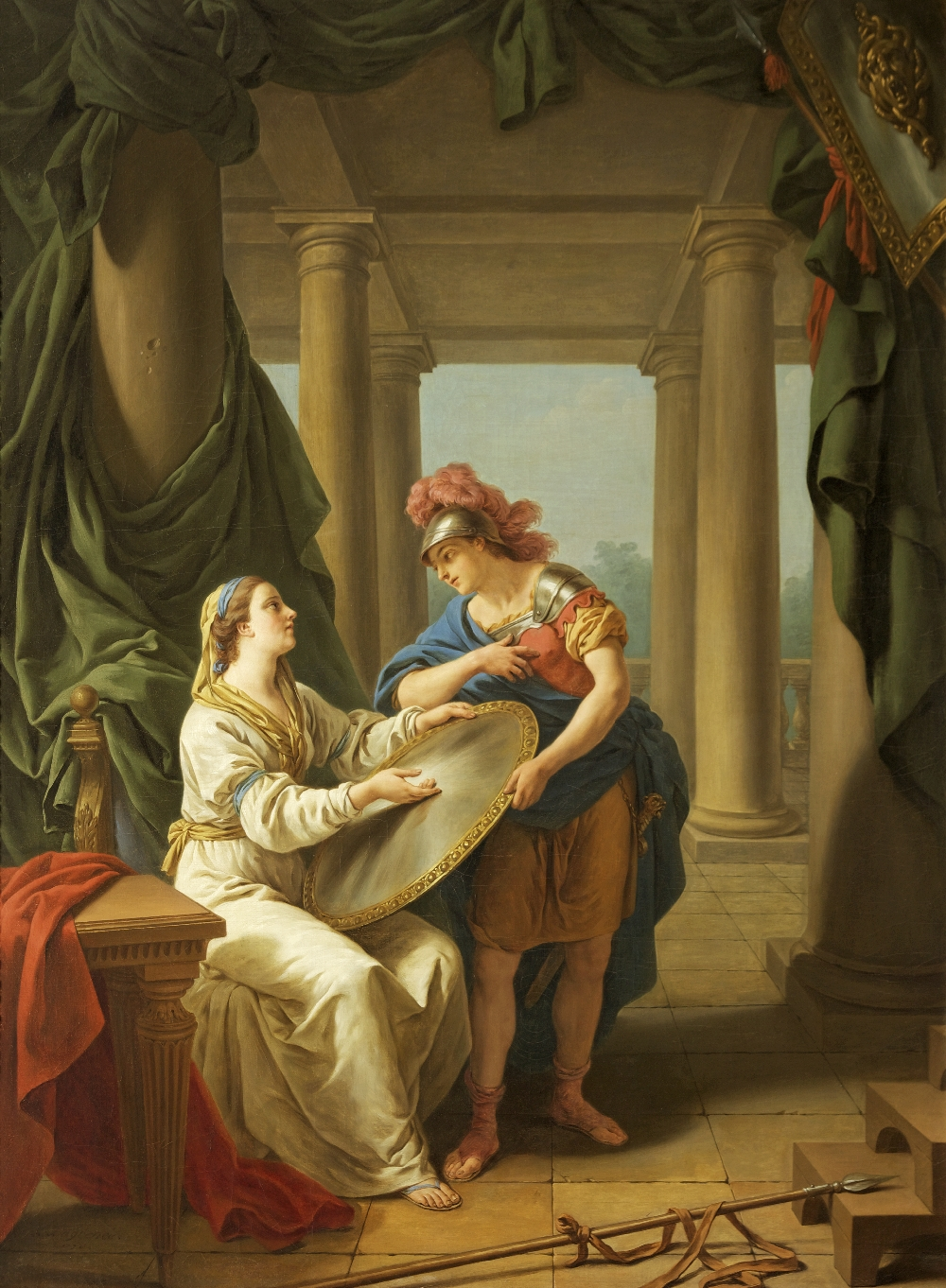
The Spartan Mother by Louis-Jean-François Lagrenée

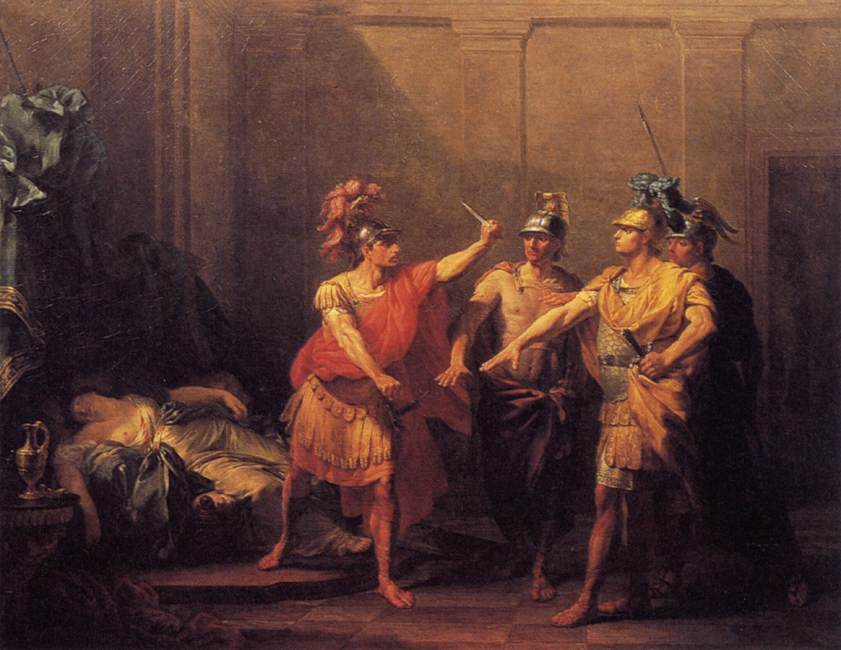
The Oath of Brutus by Jacques-Antoine Beaufort

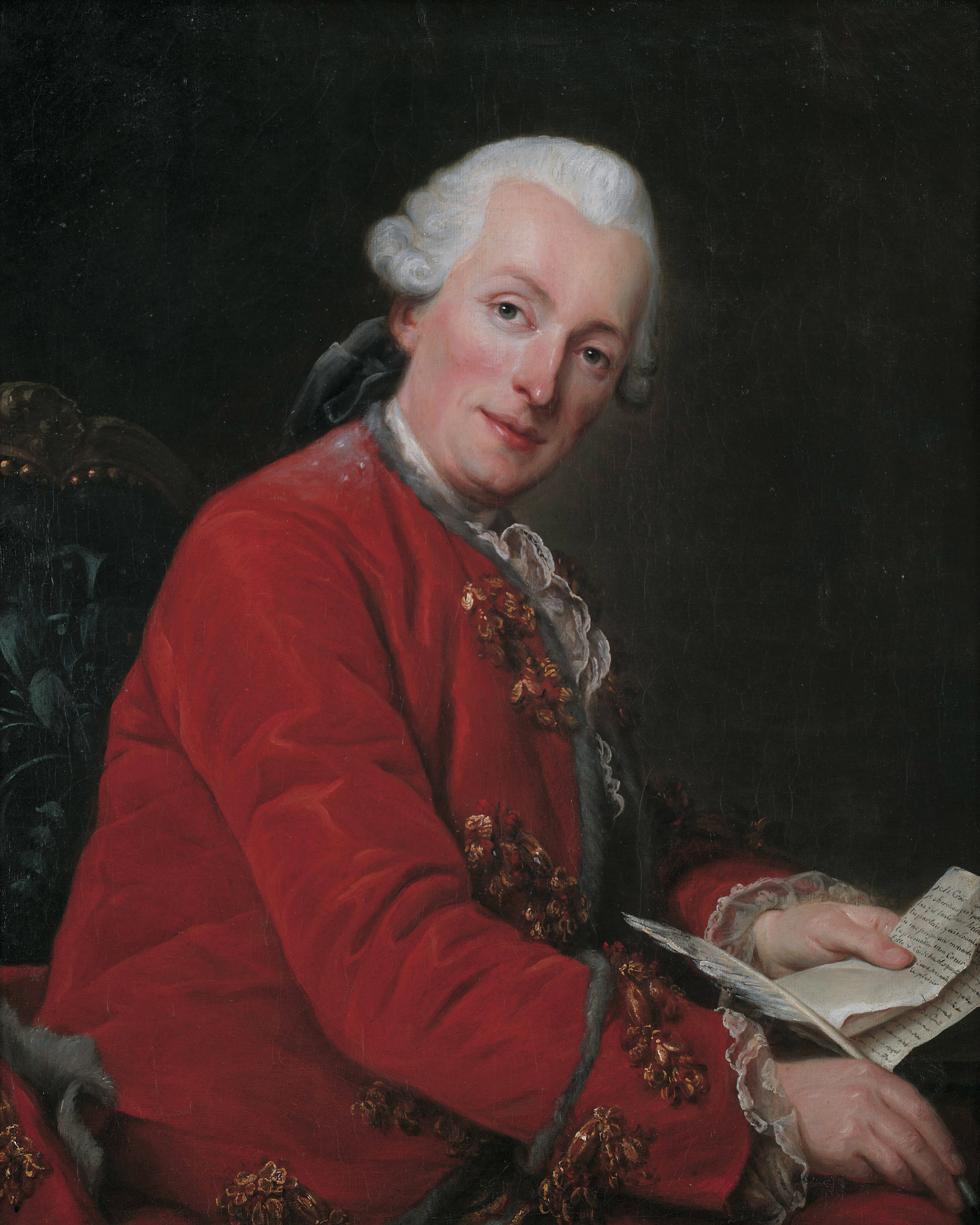
Portrait of Charles-Pierre Colardeau by Guillaume Voiriot

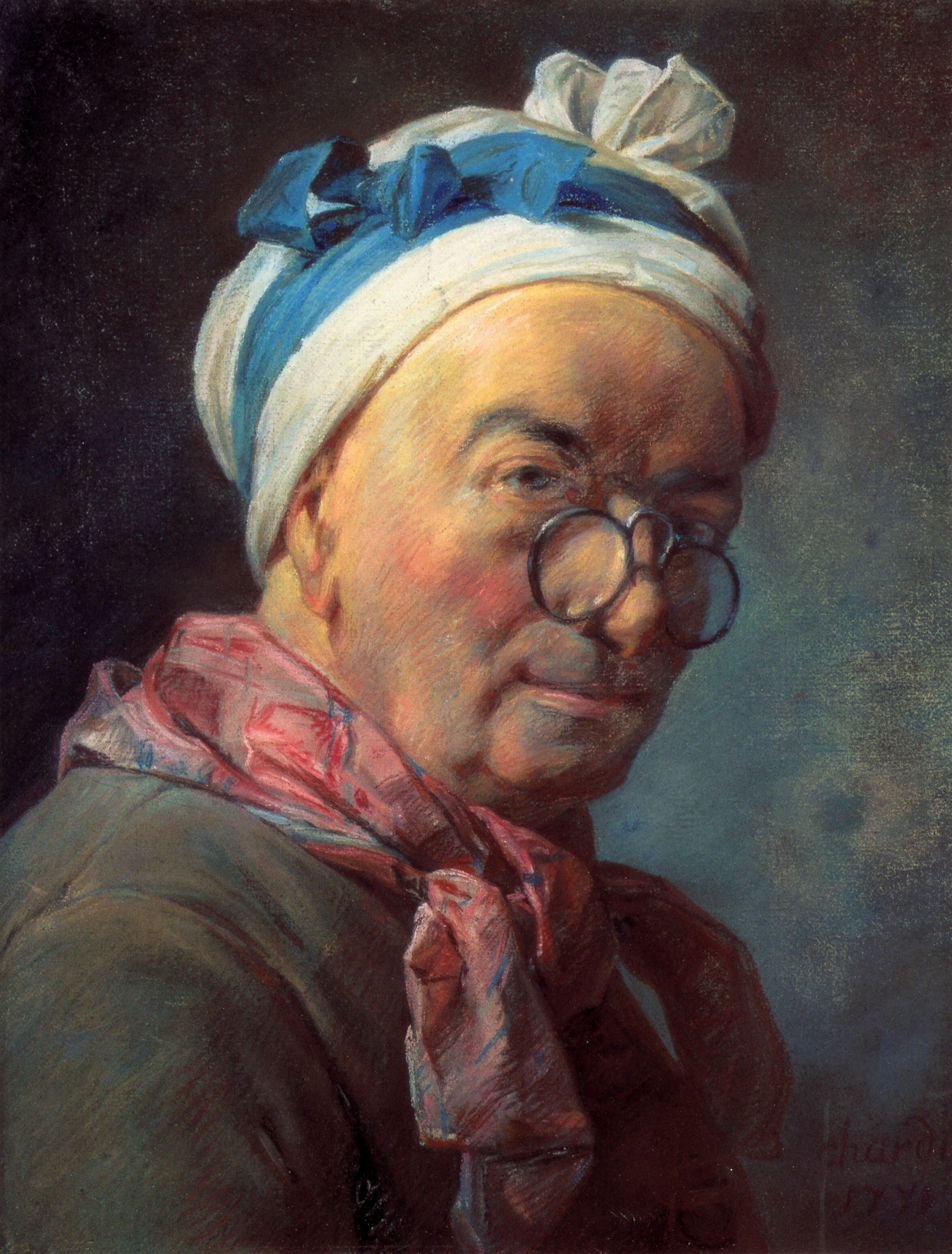
Self-Portrait in Pastel by Jean Siméon Chardin

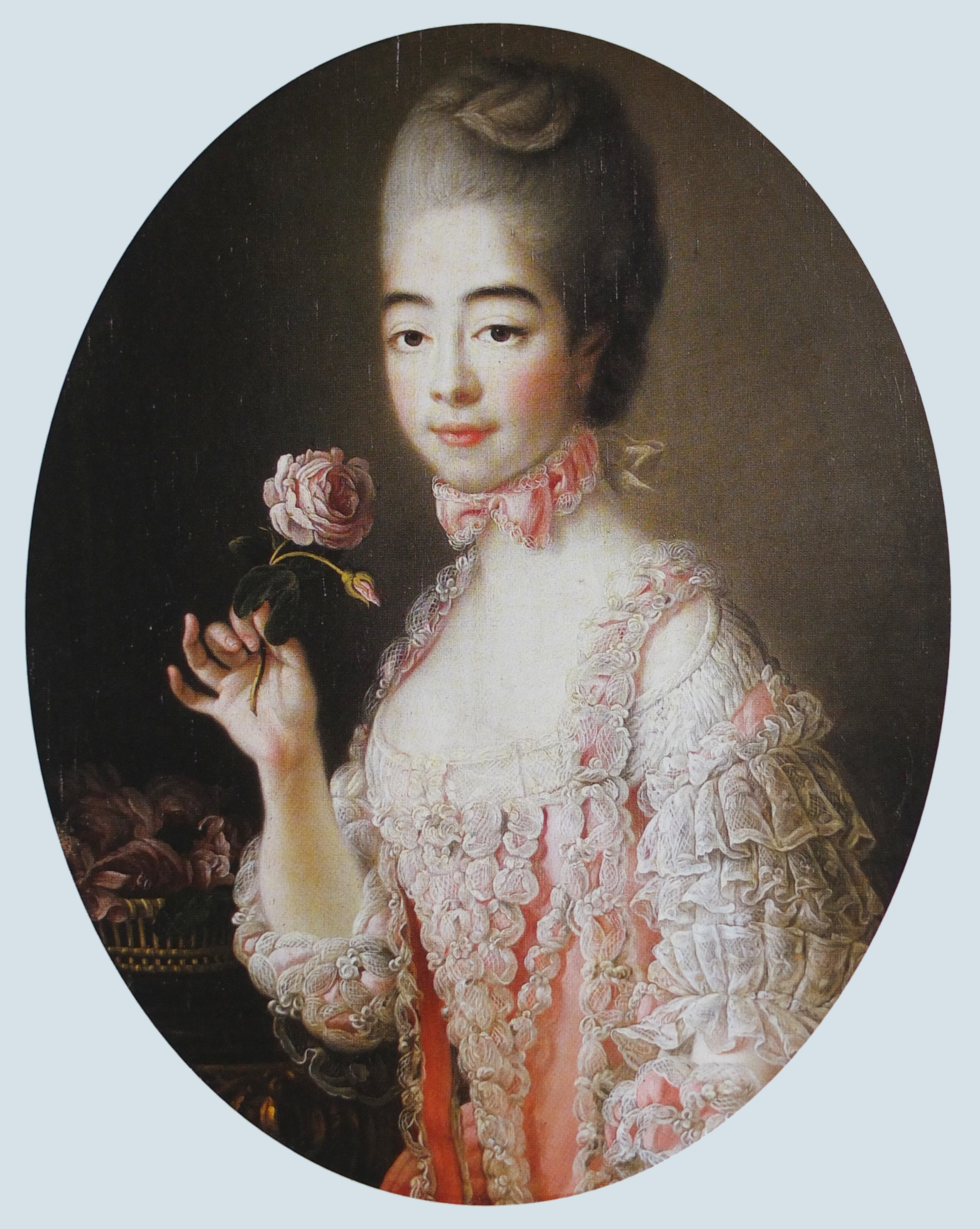
Portrait of Marie Joséphine of Savoy by François-Hubert Drouais

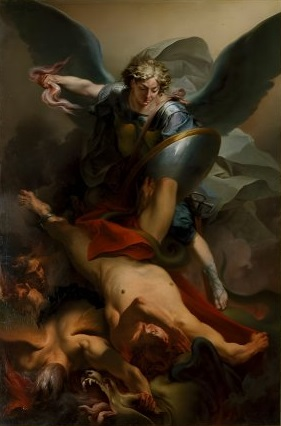
Le combat de Saint-Michel by Clément Belle

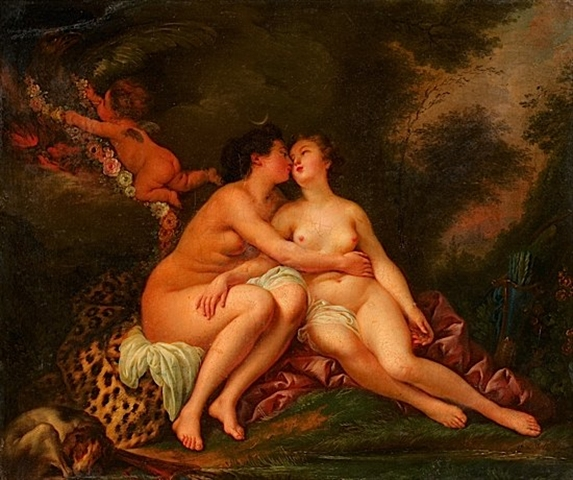
Diane and Callisto by Nicolas-René Jollain

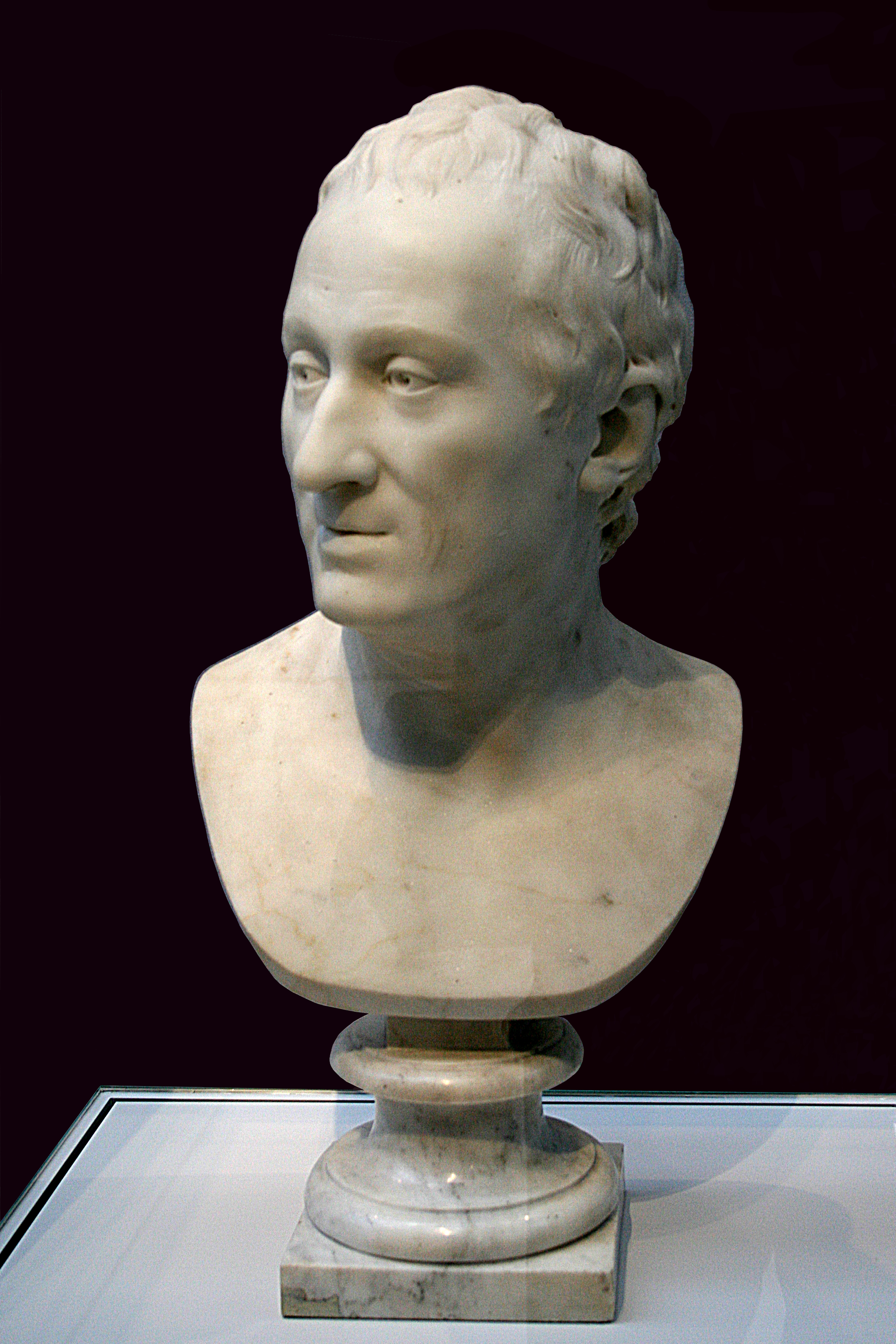
Bust of Denis Diderot by Jean-Antoine Houdon

== See also ==
- Royal Academy Exhibition of 1771, held in London

== Bibliography ==
- Poulet, Anne L. Jean-Antoine Houdon: Sculptor of the Enlightenment. University of Chicago Press, 2003.
- Rosenberg, Pierre. Chardin. Royal Academy of Arts, 2000.
