= Jean-Jacques Lagrenée =

French painter

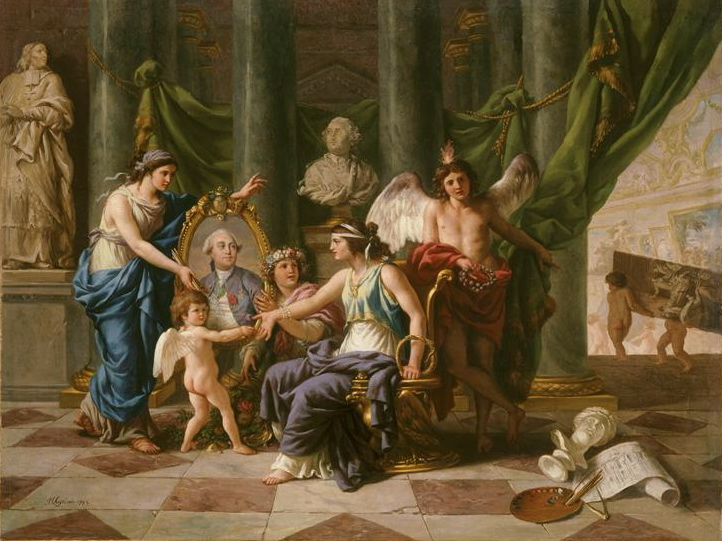
Allégorie relative à l'établissement du Museum dans la grande galerie du Louvre (1783)

Jean-Jacques Lagrenée (18 September 1739 in Paris – 13 February 1821 in Paris), known as the younger, was a French history painter and engraver. With his elder brother Louis-Jean-François Lagrenée, he stayed in Russia (1760–62) then at the Académie de Rome (1763–68).
