= The Spartan Mother =

Painting by Louis-Jean-François Lagrenée

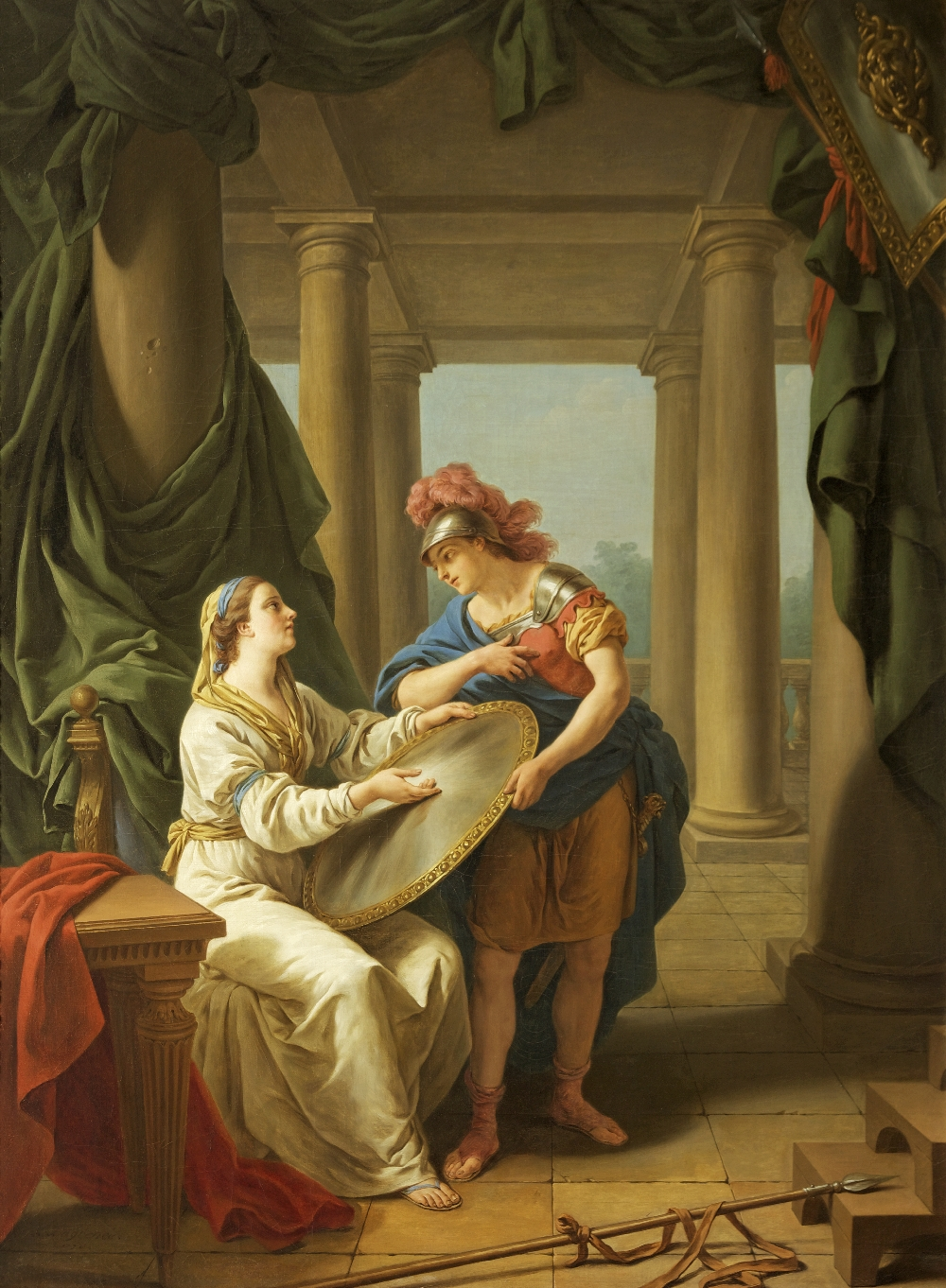
- Artist: Louis-Jean-François Lagrenée
- Year: 1770
- Type: Oil on canvas, history painting
- Dimensions: 110.5 cm × 86.5 cm (43.5 in × 34.1 in)
- Location: Stourhead, Wiltshire

The Spartan Mother (French: La lacédémonienne) is a 1770 history painting by the French artist Louis-Jean-François Lagrenée. It depicts a scene in Sparta in Ancient Greece. Inspired by Plutarch's Life of Lycurgus in Parallel Lives, it shows a Spartan mother handing her young son a shield as he prepares to go off to war, commanding him either to return in victory or with his corpse laid upon it. It is also known as A Spartan Mother Admonishing Her Son.

The painting was commissioned by the politician the Duke of Choiseul, then serving as Foreign Minister of France. The work was exhibited at the Salon of 1771 held at the Louvre in Paris. It was subsequently purchased by the British banker and art collector Henry Hoare for his country estate of Stourhead in Wiltshire. It remains in the collection at Stourhead, now in the control of the National Trust.

== Bibliography ==
- Escott, Angela. The Celebrated Hannah Cowley: Experiments in Dramatic Genre, 1776–1794. Routledge, 2015.
- Weststeijn, Arthur & Velema, Wyger. Ancient Models in the Early Modern Republican Imagination. Brill, 2017.
