= Louis-Jean-François Lagrenée =

French painter (1724–1805)

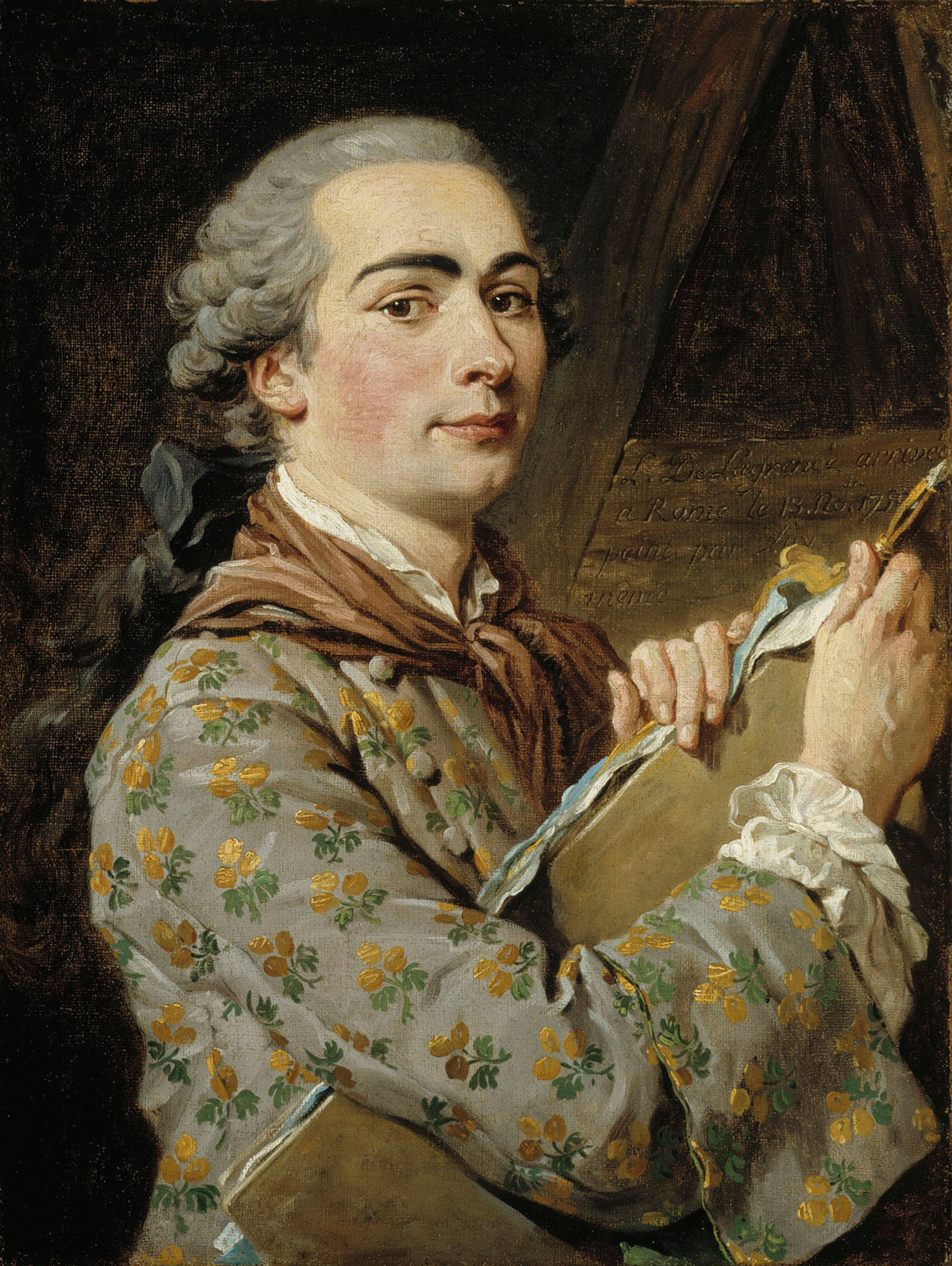
- Self-portrait, 1750s
- Born: 30 December 1724; Paris, France
- Died: 19 June 1805 (aged 80); Paris, France
- Other name: Lagrenée the elder
- Known for: Painting
- Movement: Lagrenée's work was Rococo in style, directly influenced by the Bolognese School of painting.

Louis-Jean-François Lagrenée (called Lagrenée l'aîné, Lagrenée the elder) (30 December 1724 – 19 June 1805) was a French rococo painter and student of Carle van Loo. He won the Grand Prix de Rome for painting in 1749 and was elected a member of the Académie royale de peinture et de sculpture in 1755. His younger brother Jean-Jacques Lagrenée (called Lagrenée le jeune, Lagrenée the younger) was also a painter.

== Biography ==
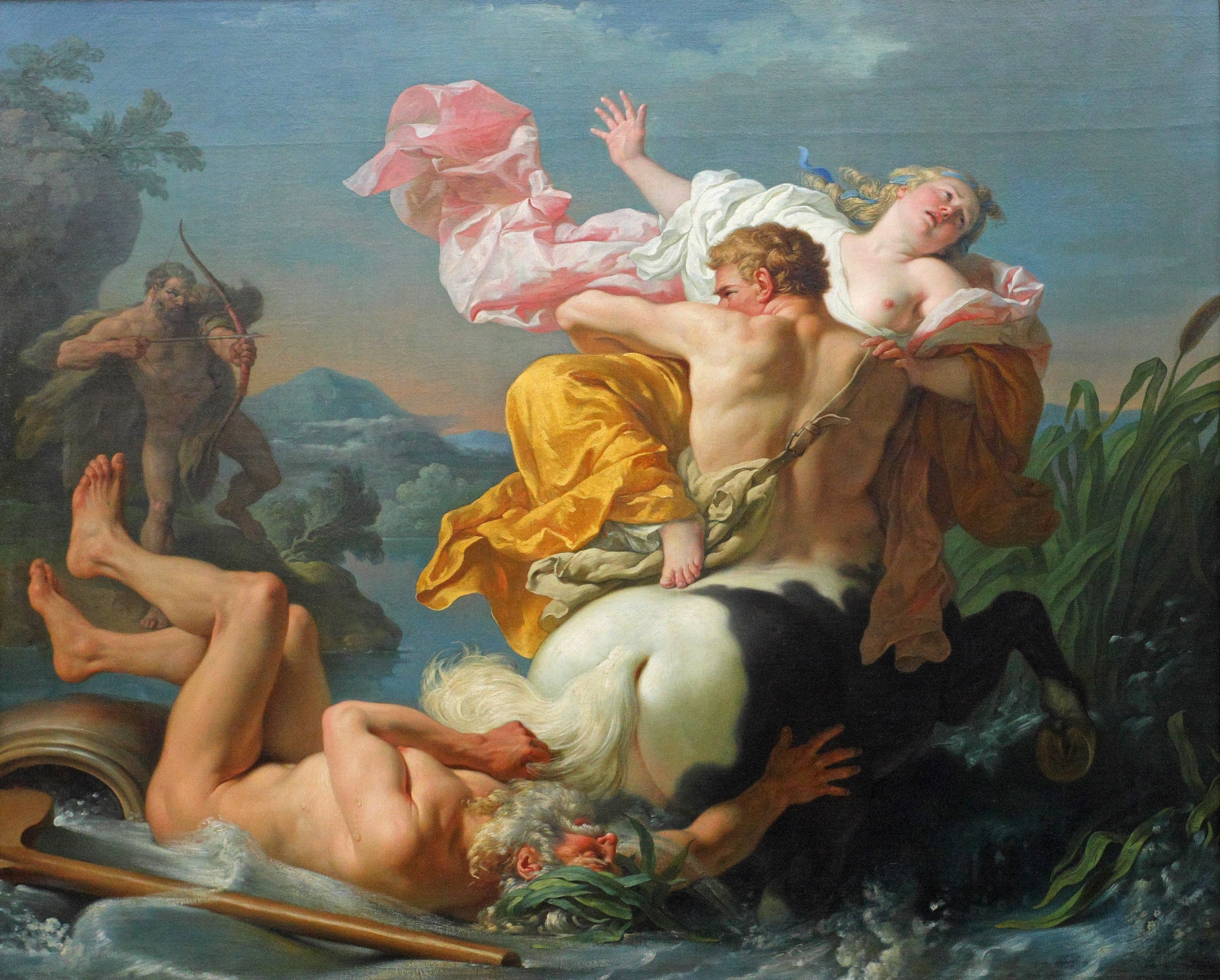
The Abduction of Deianira by the Centaur Nessus, (1755).

He was born in Paris on the 30th of December 1724 and from an early age he showed promise in drawing and painting. During his youth, master painter members of the French Royal Academy offered a rolling programme of courses, open to the public (for a small fee), in life drawing and the principles and techniques of art. These courses gave academy members a chance to identify and nurture six of the most gifted young students in any given year and offer them a place on a scheme known as the École royale des élèves protégés, a scheme which offered free tuition with a small stipend for three years, preparing students for Prix de Rome competitions. After being selected for and completing this three-year programme, under the tutelage of Carle van Loo, he won the Grand Prix de Rome on his first attempt in 1749, with the painting Joseph interpreting the dreams of Pharaoh (now lost).

As a student at the French Academy in Rome, he developed a "Formative if youthful fixation with Baroque painting". Above all, he was inspired by the Bolognese school, particularly by the work of Guido Reni (1575–1642) and Francesco Albani (1578–1660). Later in his career, he acquired the epithet 'the French Albani' (l'Albane Francais).

After returning from Rome in 1753, he set to work on a large painting - The Abduction of Deianira by the Centaur Nessus (Musée du Louvre) - which, when finished in 1755, was the reception piece which earned him a membership in the Royal Academy, by a unanimous vote. By this time, he was already considered something of a celebrity.

On Monday the 10th of July 1758, at the age of 33, he married 16-year-old Anne-Agathe Isnard. Fifty-five years later, on 19 June 1805, his death certificate recorded that they were still married.

=== Later career ===
His career blossomed in Paris, by completing many commissions for eminent patrons and members of a flourishing new financial community as well as submitting regular entries to the Paris salon exhibitions. His reputation caught the attention of Elizabeth Petrovna, Empress of Russia, who, in 1760, appointed him to the offices of the director of the Imperial Academy of Arts and that of her principal court painter. After only two years in Russia, he returned to Paris to take up the appointment of professor-rector at the Royal Academy.

He spent the years between 1781 and 1787 at the Villa Medici in Rome, in his capacity as director of the French Academy. A final return to Paris saw him appointed to the position of honorary curator-director (administration) of the Louvre museum. He was made a Knight of the Legion of Honour on the 15th of July 1804 by Napoleon. He died the following year.

== Works in Public Collections (non exhaustive) ==
=== Paintings ===
- Paris, musée du Louvre : L'Enlèvement de Déjanire par le centaure Nessus (1755), Mercure, Aglaure et Hersé (1767), Psyché surprend l'Amour endormi (1768), La Mort de la Femme de Darius (1785), L'Amour des Arts console la Peinture des écrits ridicules et envenimés de ses ennemis
- Stockholm, Nationalmuseum : Mercury, Herse and Aglauros (1767), Cupid and Psyche (1767), Bacchus and Ariadne (1768), Diana and Endymion (1768)
- Musée national des châteaux de Versailles et de Trianon : La Moisson - Cérès et l'Agriculture (vers 1770)
- Los Angeles, Getty Center : Vénus et Mars, une allégorie de la Paix (1770)
- Musée des beaux-arts de Quimper : Esther et Assuérus (1775–1780)
- Musée des arts décoratifs de Paris : Jupiter transformé en taureau enlève Europe, Thétys reçoit Apollon
- Detroit Institute of Arts : Pygmalion and Galatea, (1781)
- Palace of Fontainebleau : The death of the Dauphin, surrounded by his family, (1765)
- Lyon Cathedral, Saint John the Evangelist on the Island of Patmos, (1758)

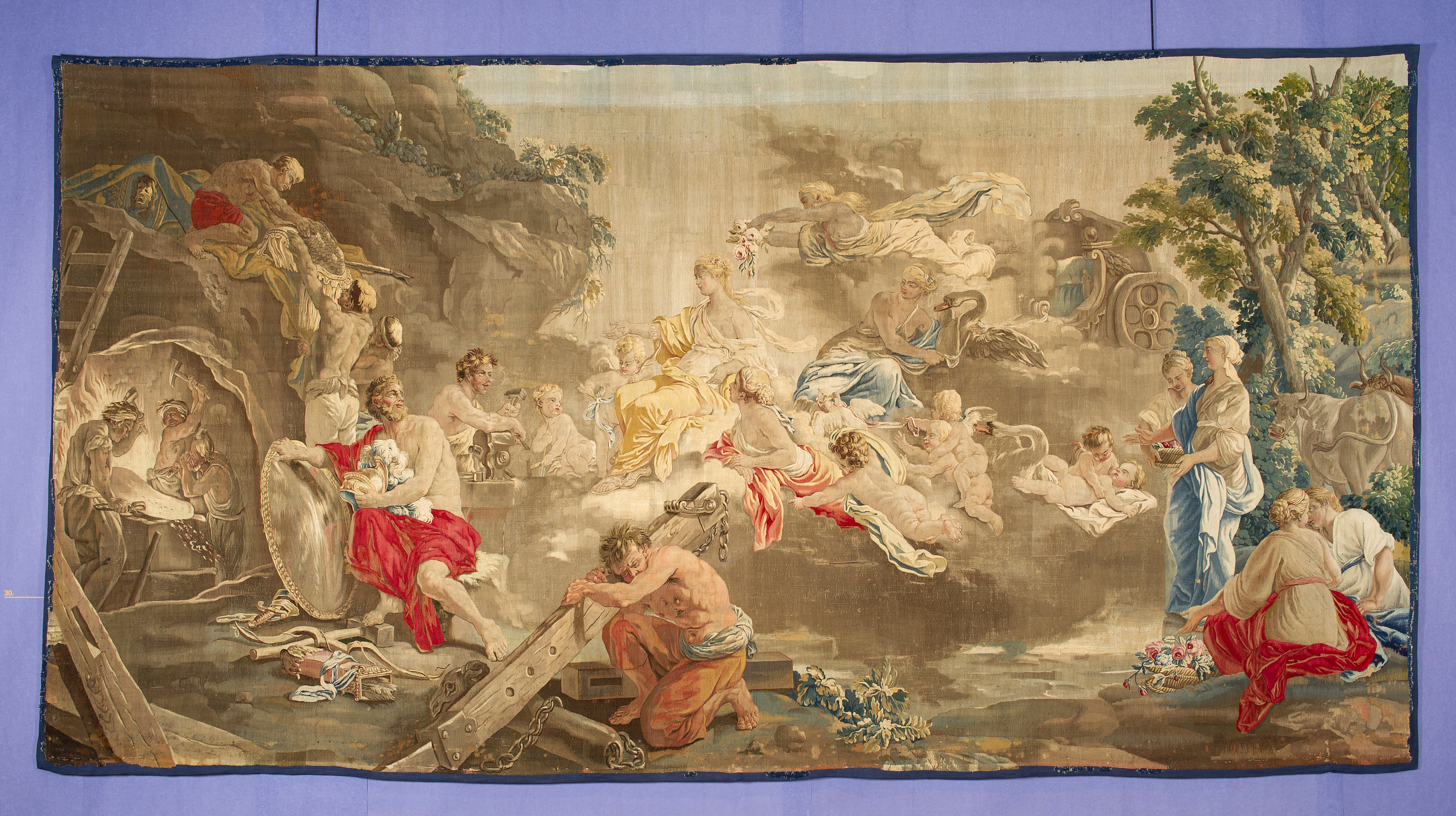
Vénus aux Forges (c. 1760), Tapestry

=== Tapestries ===
- Collection of mythological subjects, after six paintings, acquired by the administration royale for the manufacture d'Aubusson, 1759:
  - Aurore enlève Céphale, whereabouts of cartoon unknown.
  - Jupiter transformé en taureau enlève Europe, carton conserved at the musée des Arts décoratifs de Paris
  - Vénus aux forges de Lemnos, cartoon described by Denis Diderot after the Salon of 1759, tapestry conserved at the musée départemental de la tapisserie d'Aubusson
  - Borée enlève Orythie, whereabouts unknown.
  - Thétys reçoit Apollon, cartoon conserved at the musée des Arts décoratifs, Paris
  - Mercure apporte Bacchus aux nymphes de Nysa, also known as La Naissance de Bacchus, tapestry conserved at the Mobilier National, Paris.

== Gallery ==
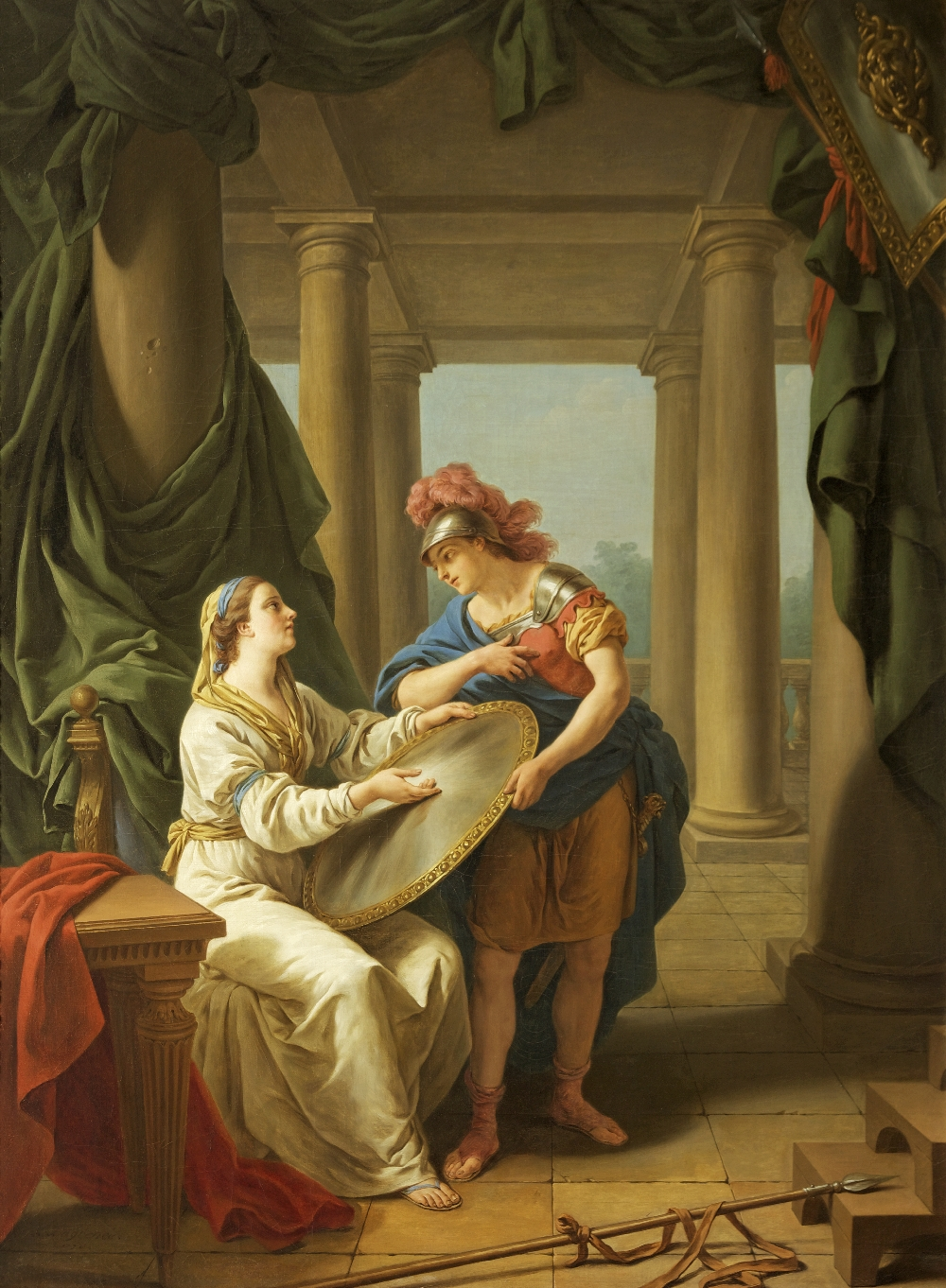
The Spartan Mother (1770)

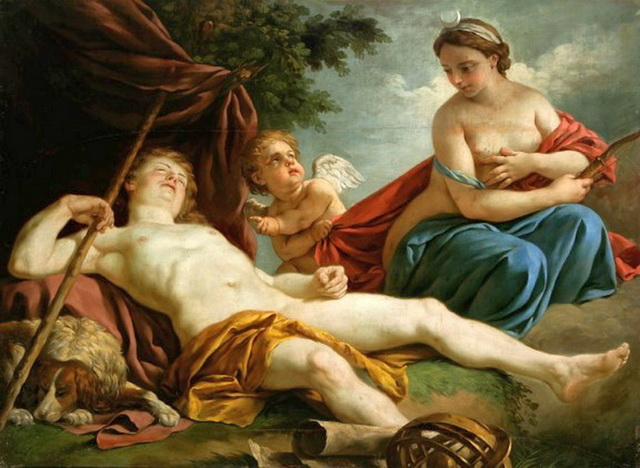
Diana and Endymion, (1776)

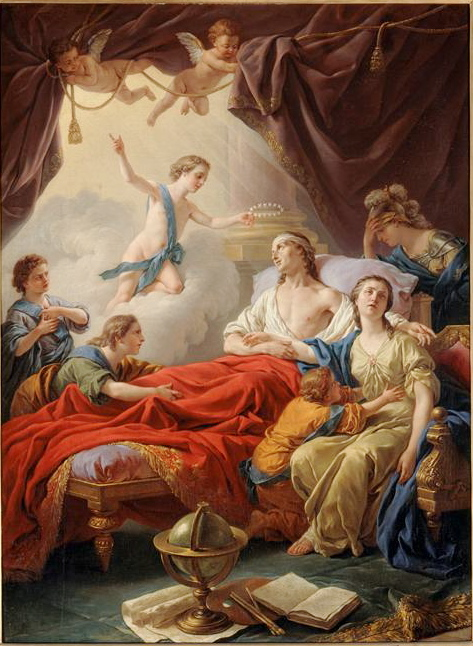
Death of the Louis, Dauphin of France (born 1729), (1765)

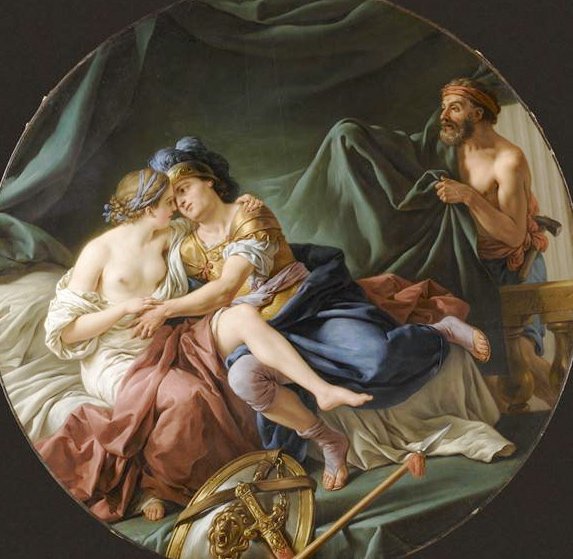
Mars and Venus Surprised by Vulcan, (1768)

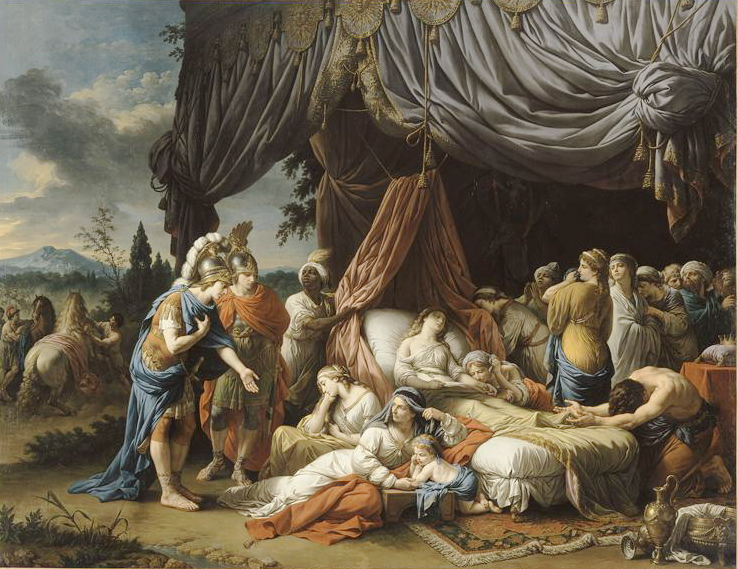
Death of the Wife of Darius, (1785)

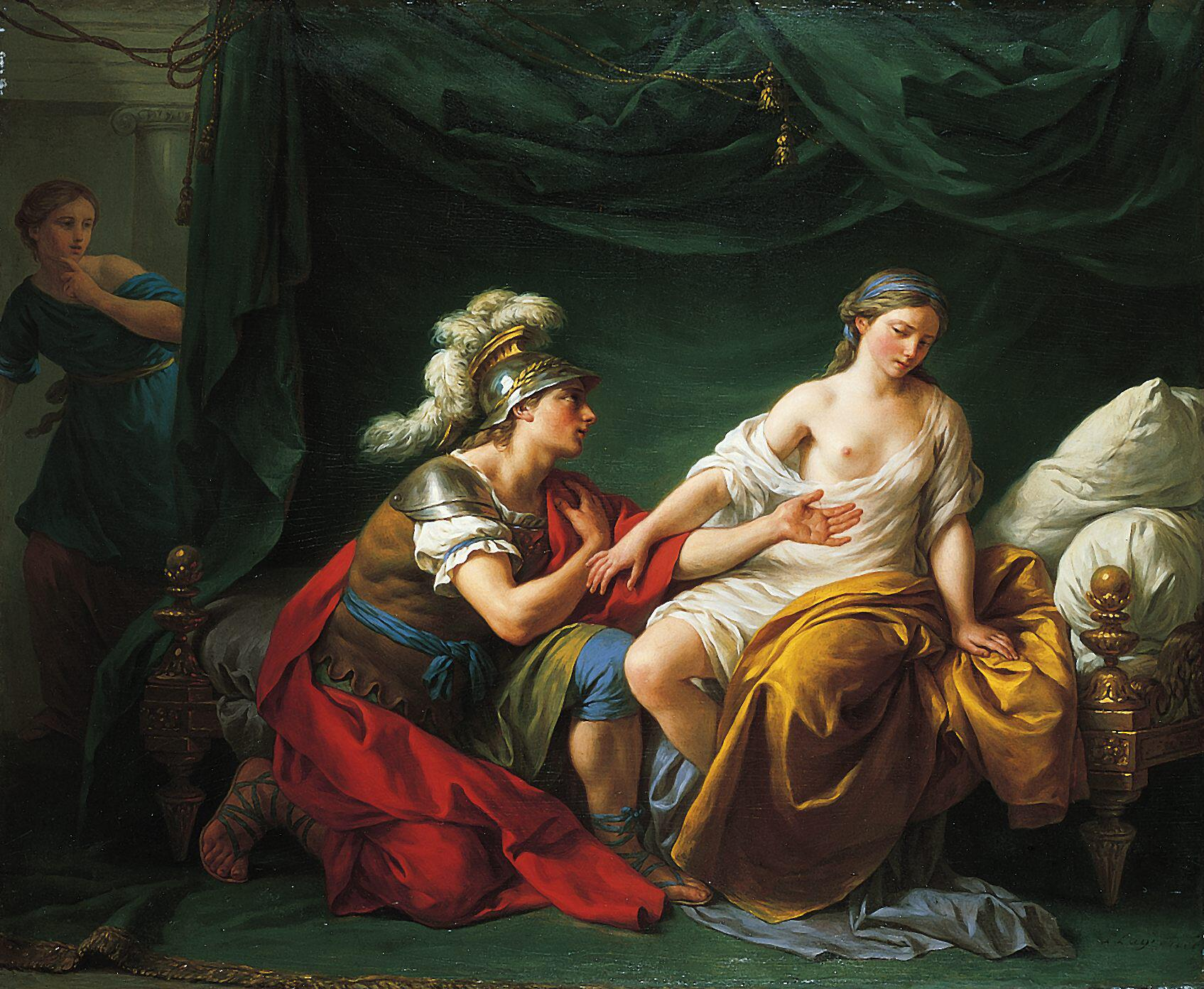
Alcibiades on his Knees Before his Mistress (c. 1781)

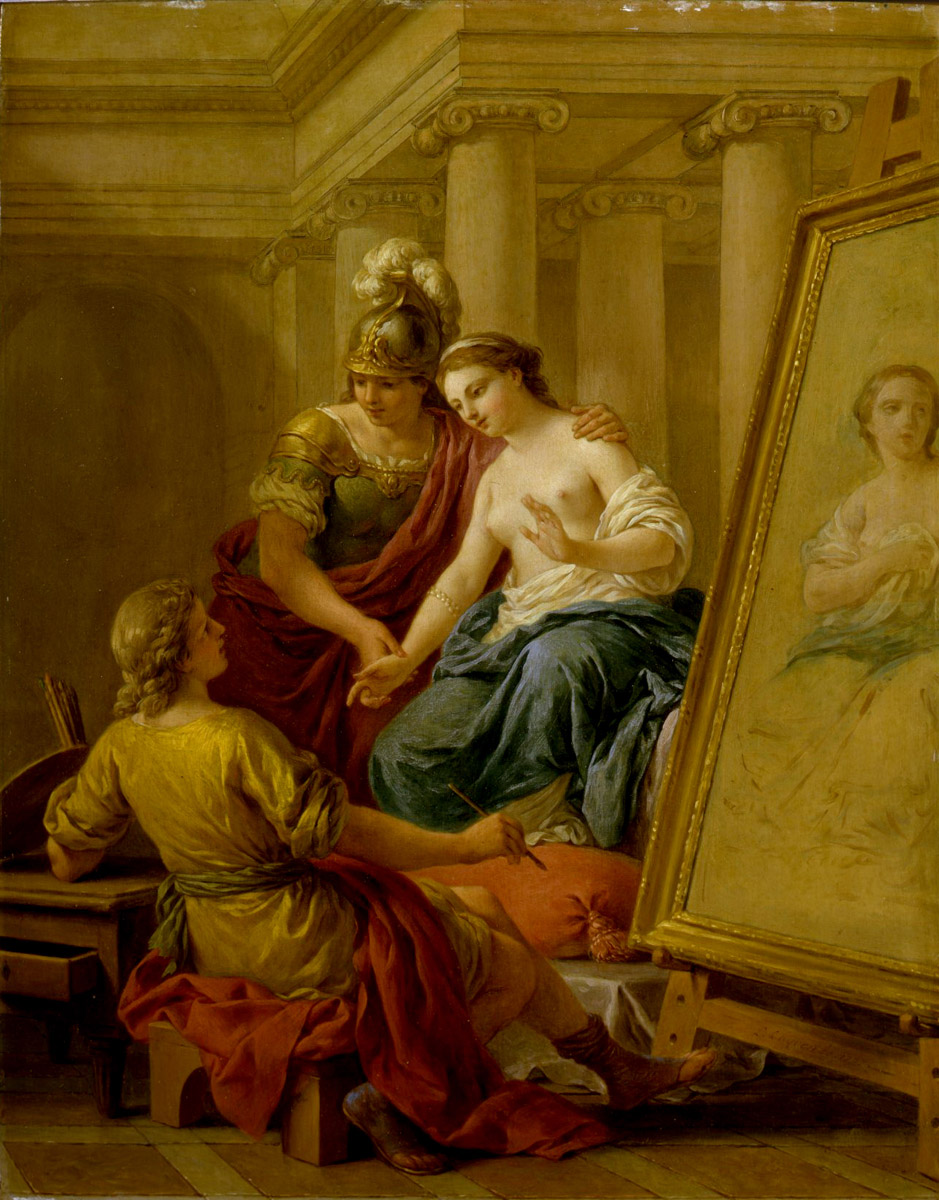
Apelles in Love with Alexander's Mistress (1772)

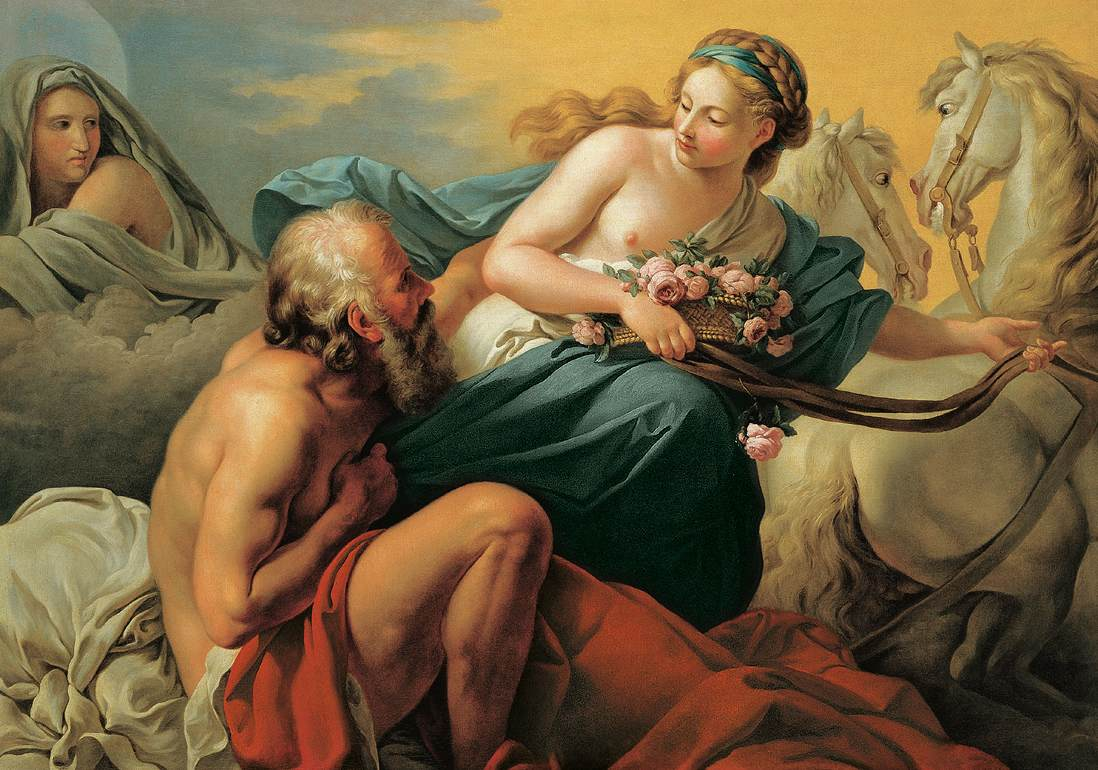
The Ascent of Aurora, (1763)

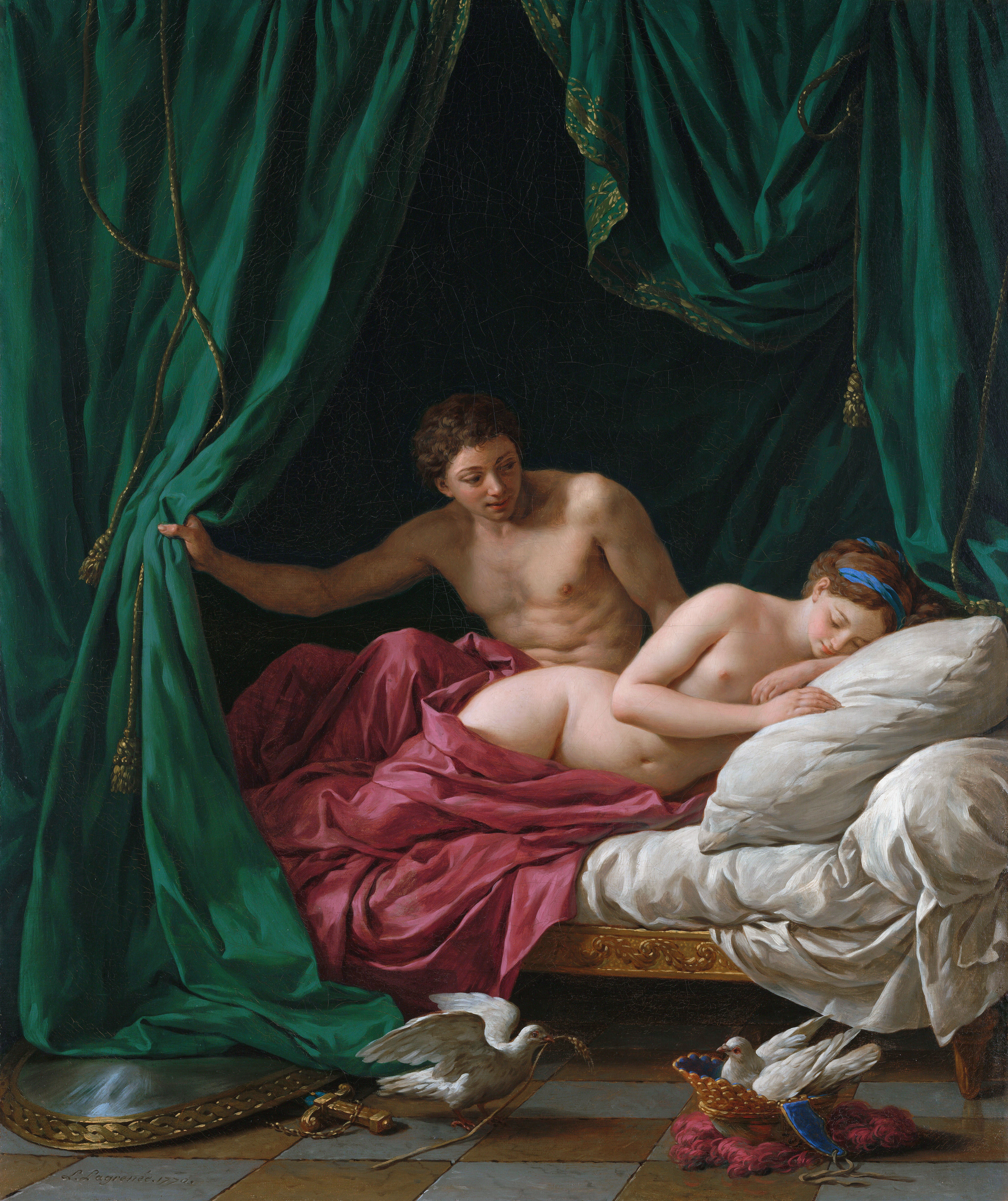
Mars and Venus, An Allegory of Peace (1770)

== Notable students ==
- Antoine-Denis Chaudet (1763–1810)
- Lagrenée le Jeune (the younger), (his brother)
- Pierre Peyron (1744–1814)

== Bibliography ==
- Benezit Dictionary of Artists
- Marc Sandoz, Les Lagrenée, I. Louis (Jean, François) Lagrénée, 1725–1805, Tours, 1983
- Pascal-François Bertrand, « La tenture des sujets mythologiques d'après Lagrenée l'aîné reconstituée », dans Aubusson, tapisseries des Lumières, Paris, Aubusson, 2013
- Chisholm, Hugh, ed. (1911). "Lagrenée, Louis Jean François" . Encyclopædia Britannica. Vol. 16 (11th ed.). Cambridge University Press. p. 78.
