= Salon of 1759 =

1759 art exhibition in Paris

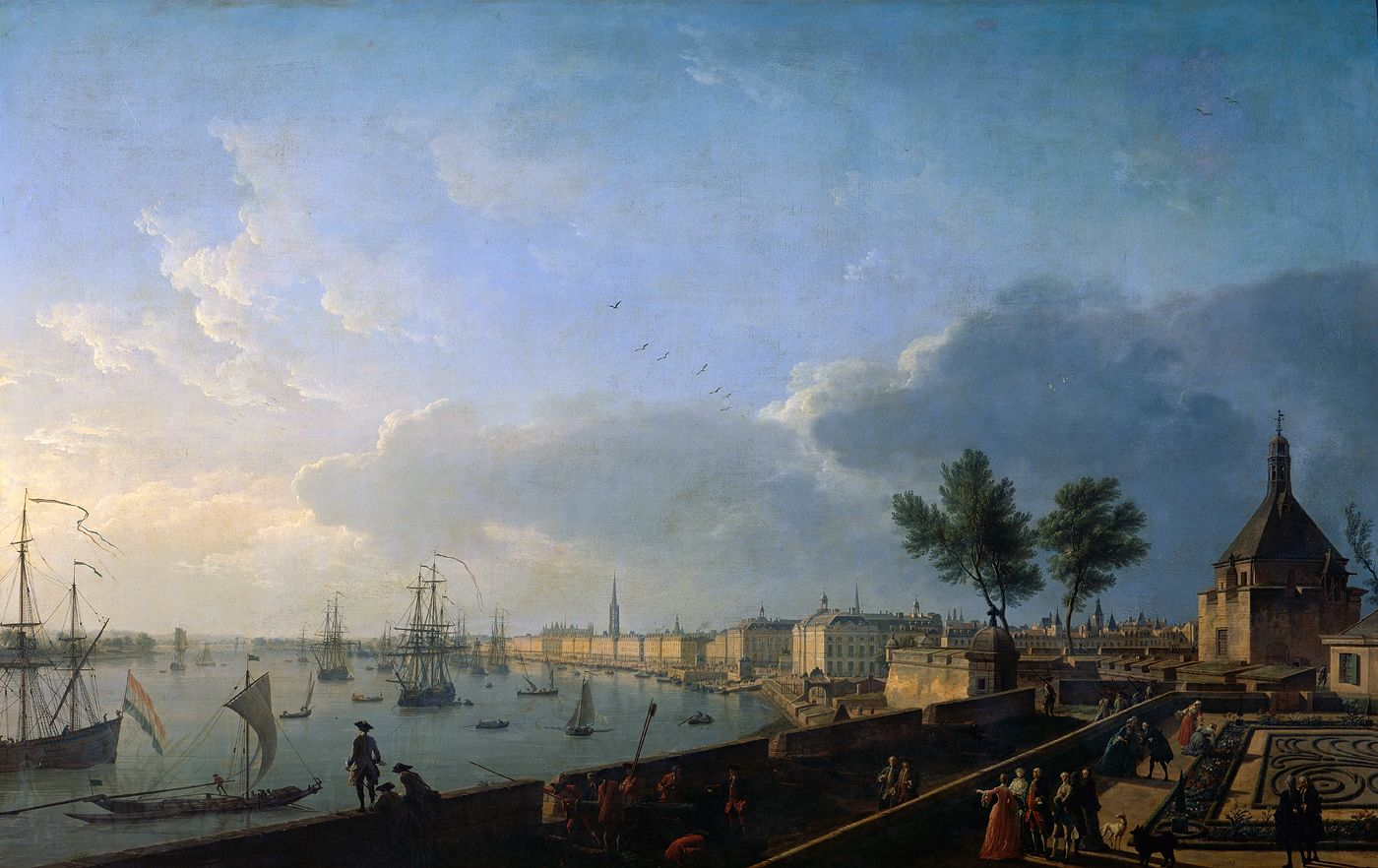
View of the Harbour of Bordeaux by Claude-Joseph Vernet

The Salon of 1759 held at the Louvre in Paris. Organised by the Académie Royale, it took place between 25 August and 25 September 1759. Taking place during the Seven Years' War, it coincided with the Annus Mirabilis of 1759 which saw France suffer a series of defeats to Britain around the globe.

Claude-Joseph Vernet continued to exhibit his series of paintings Views of the Ports of France which had been commissioned by Louis XV. This time he submitted two landscapes of Bordeaux. In addition he displayed View of Avignon from the Right Bank of the Rhone, a depiction of his home city Avignon, which had been commissioned by Pierre-Gabriel Peilhon. The celebrated stage actress Mademoiselle Clairon was depicted by Charles-André van Loo in the role of Medea in Pierre Corneille's Médée. While a great success with the public, it received a more mixed critical reception.

Jean-Marc Nattier displayed a Portrait of a Lady as a Vestal Virgin, a work which was praised by the art critic Denis Diderot who noted the ironic nature featuring an obviously a woman of the world. Meanwhile Guillaume Voiriot displayed a portrait of Nattier, his diploma work on acceptance to the academy. Jean-Baptiste-Henri Deshays enjoyed great success with his religious painting The Martyrdom of Saint Andrew.

== Gallery ==
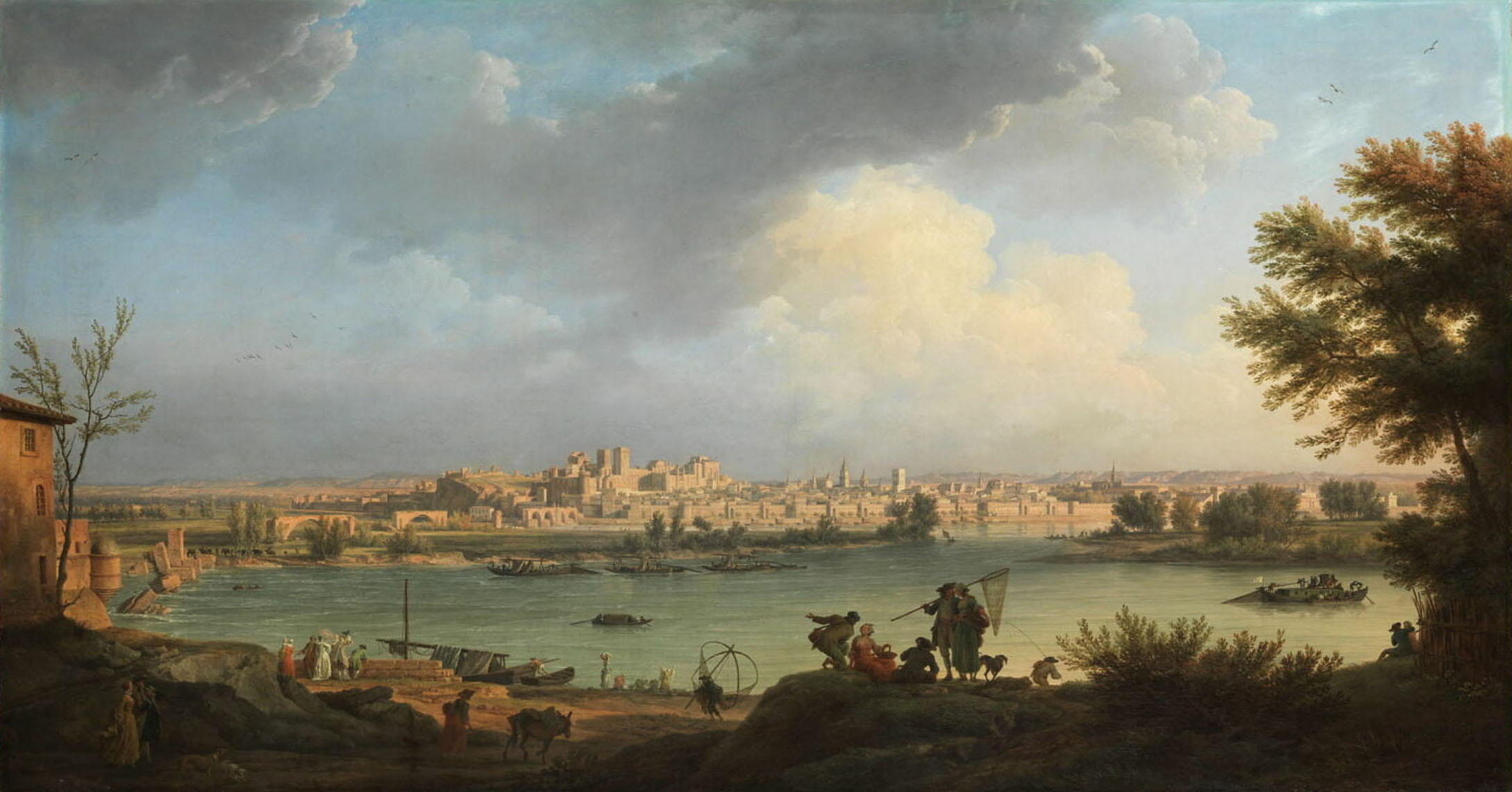
View of Avignon from the Right Bank of the Rhone by Claude-Joseph Vernet

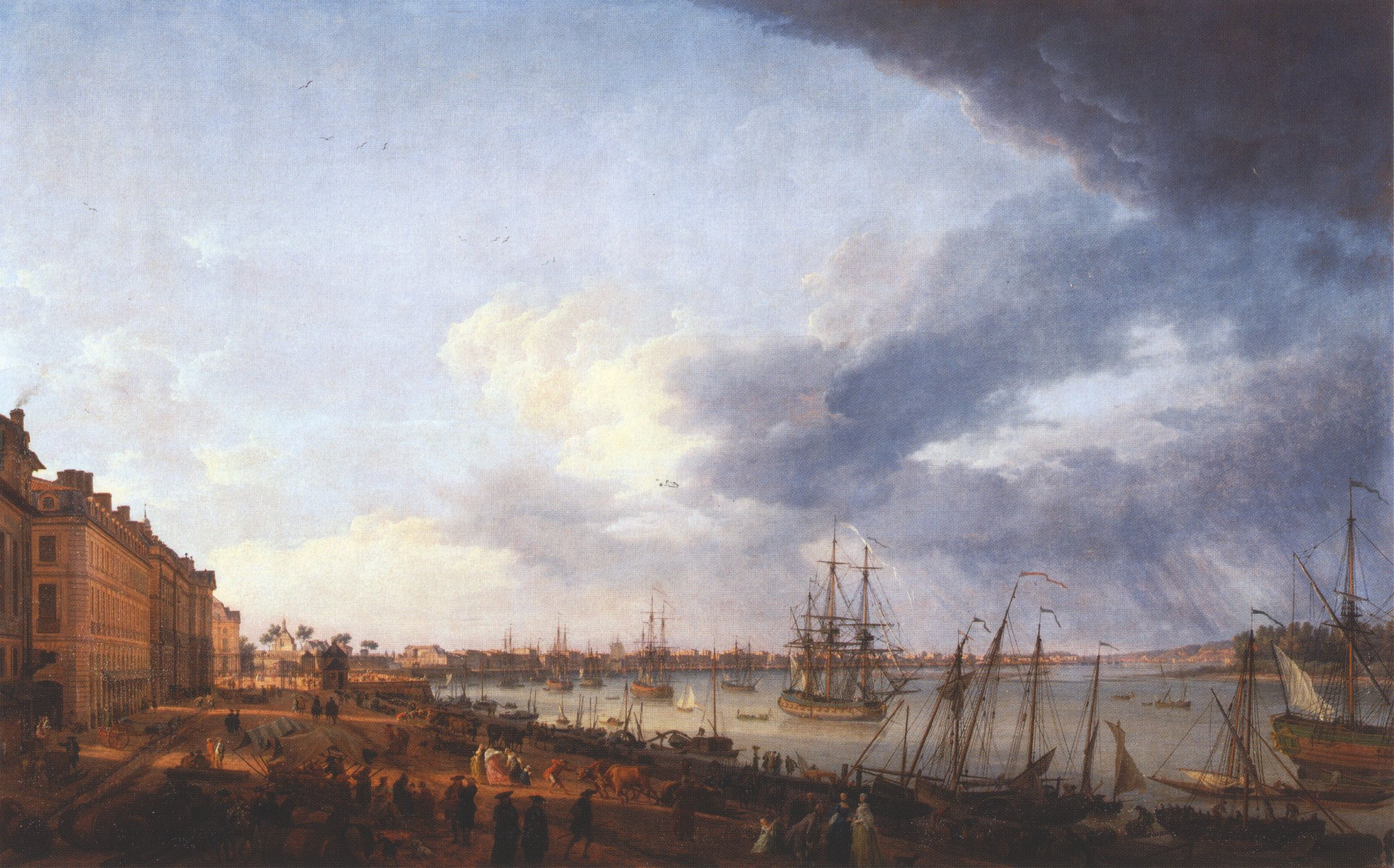
View of Part of the Port and the City of Bordeaux by Claude-Joseph Vernet

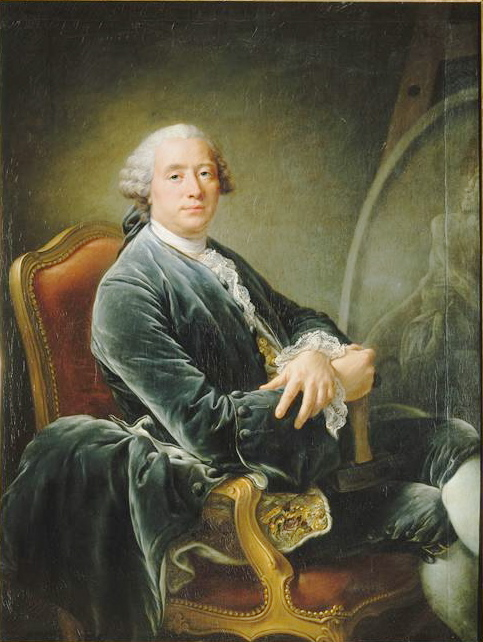
Portrait of Guillaume Coustou the Younger by François-Hubert Drouais

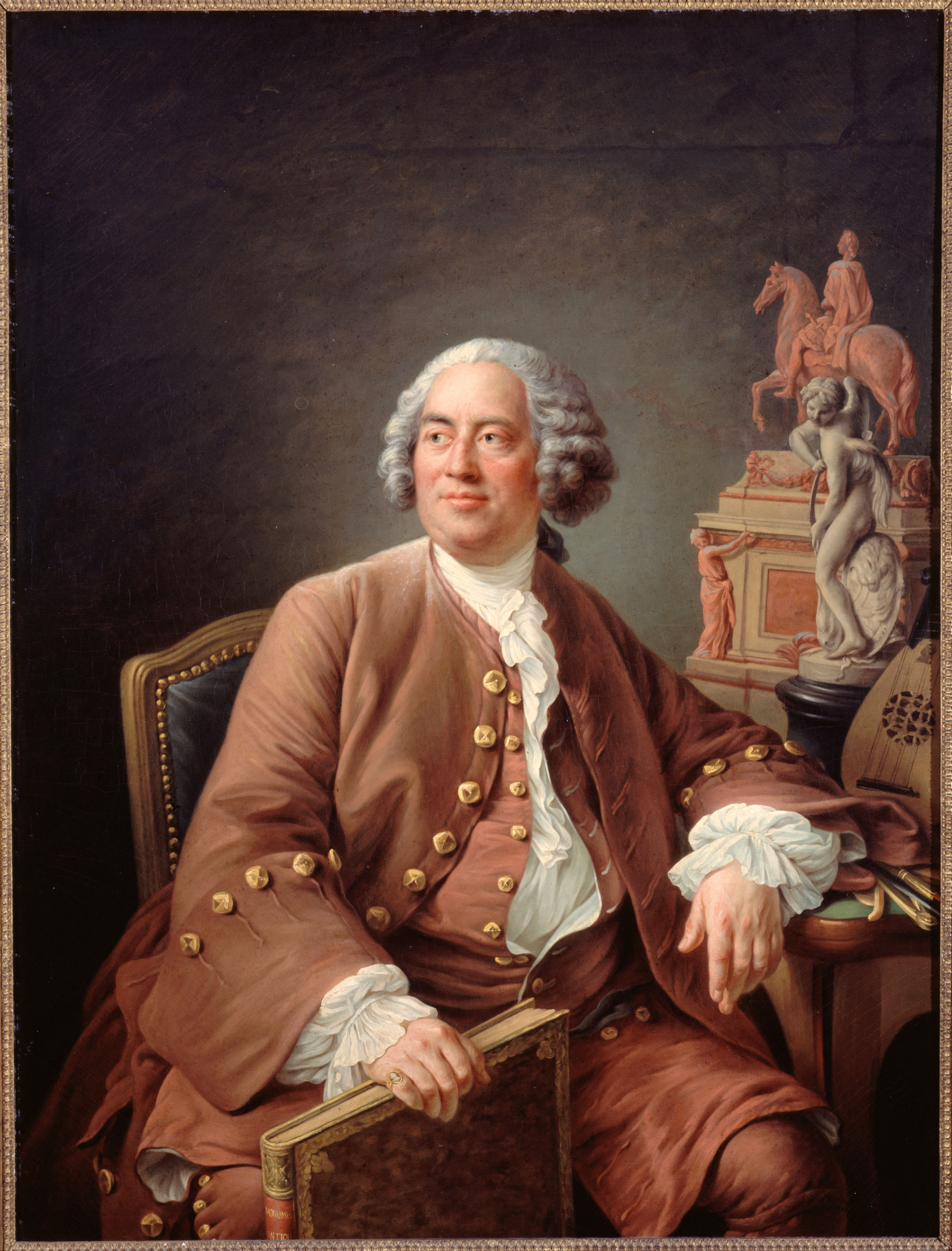
Portrait of Edmé Bouchardon by François-Hubert Drouais

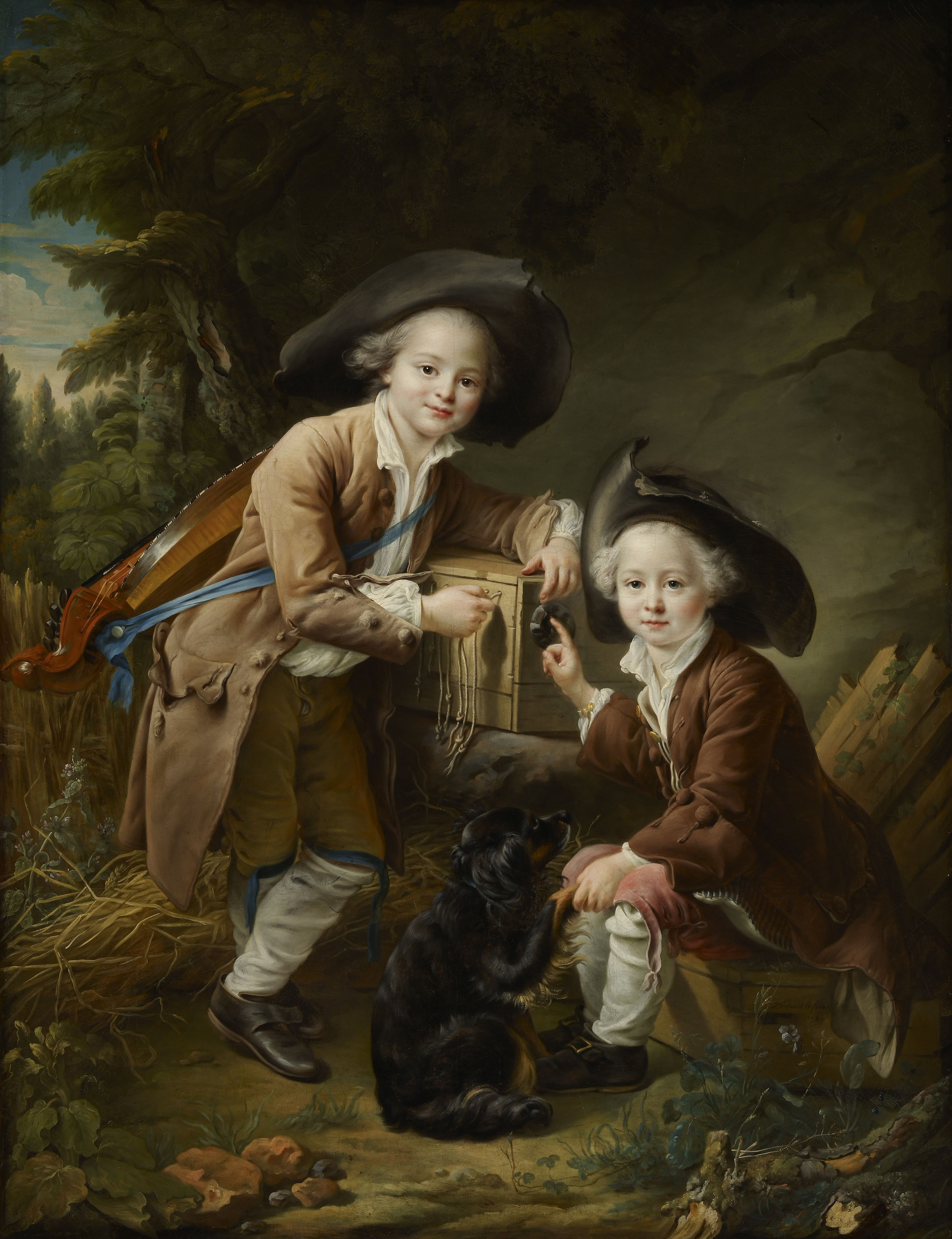
The Comte and Chevalier de Choiseul as Savoyards by François-Hubert Drouais

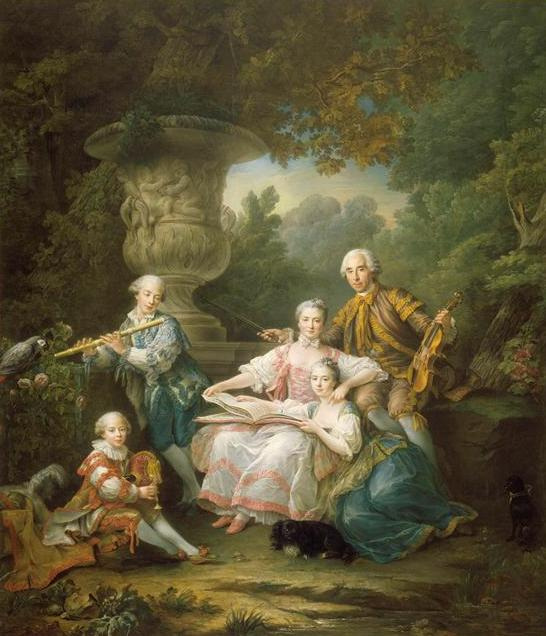
The Marquis de Sourches and His Family by François-Hubert Drouais

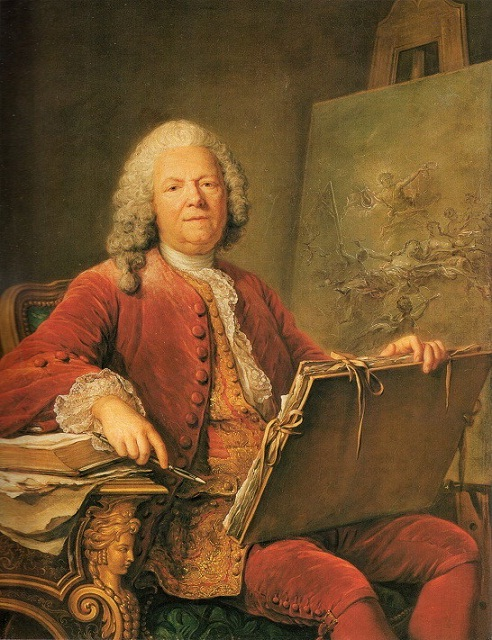
Portrait of Jean-Marc Nattier by Guillaume Voiriot

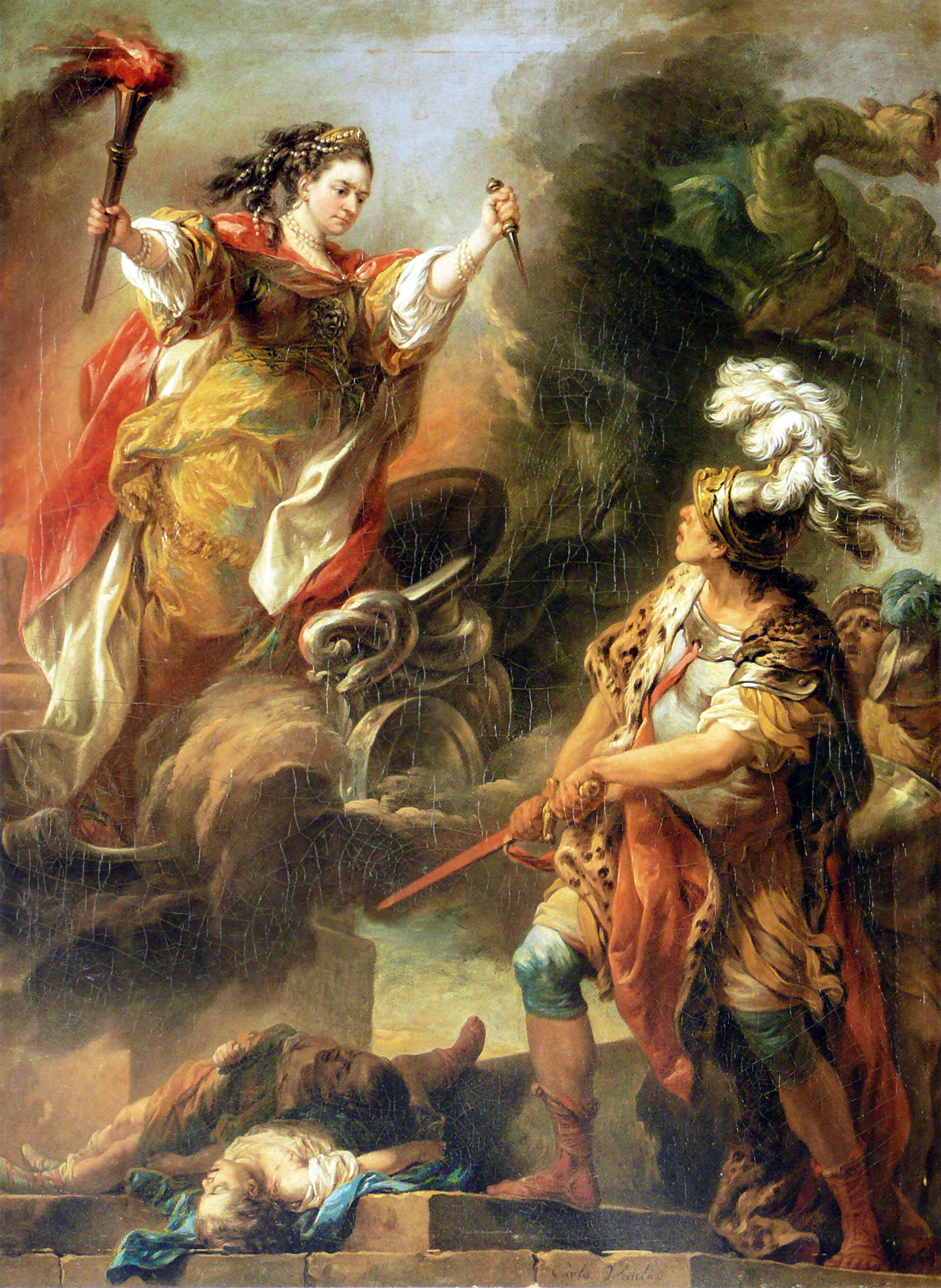
Mademoiselle Clairon in Médée by Charles-André van Loo

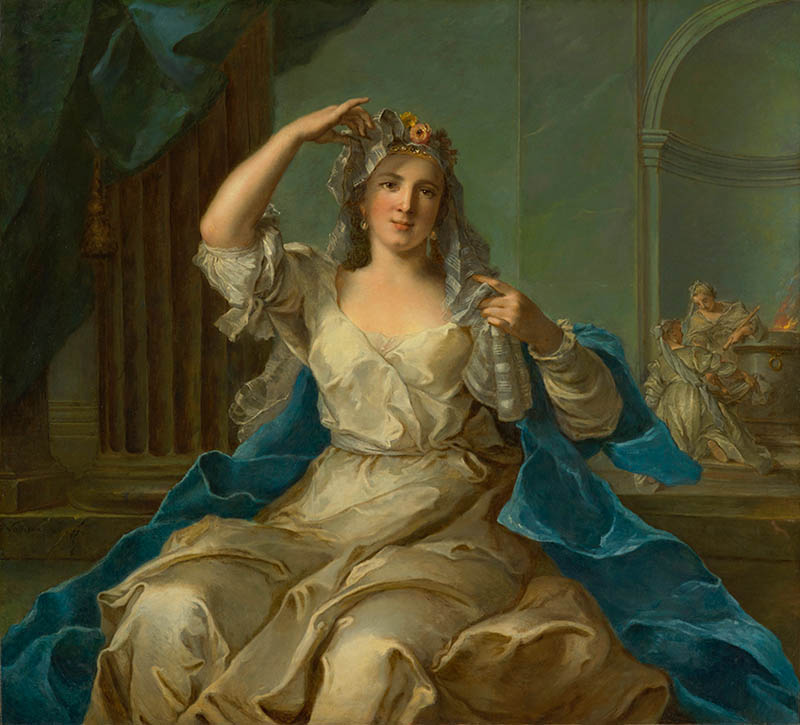
Portrait of a Lady as a Vestal Virgin by Jean-Marc Nattier

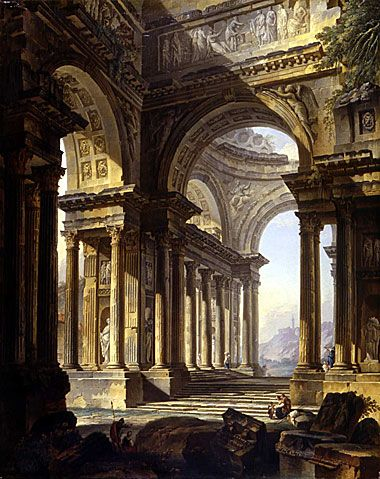
A Ruined Temple by Pierre-Antoine Demachy

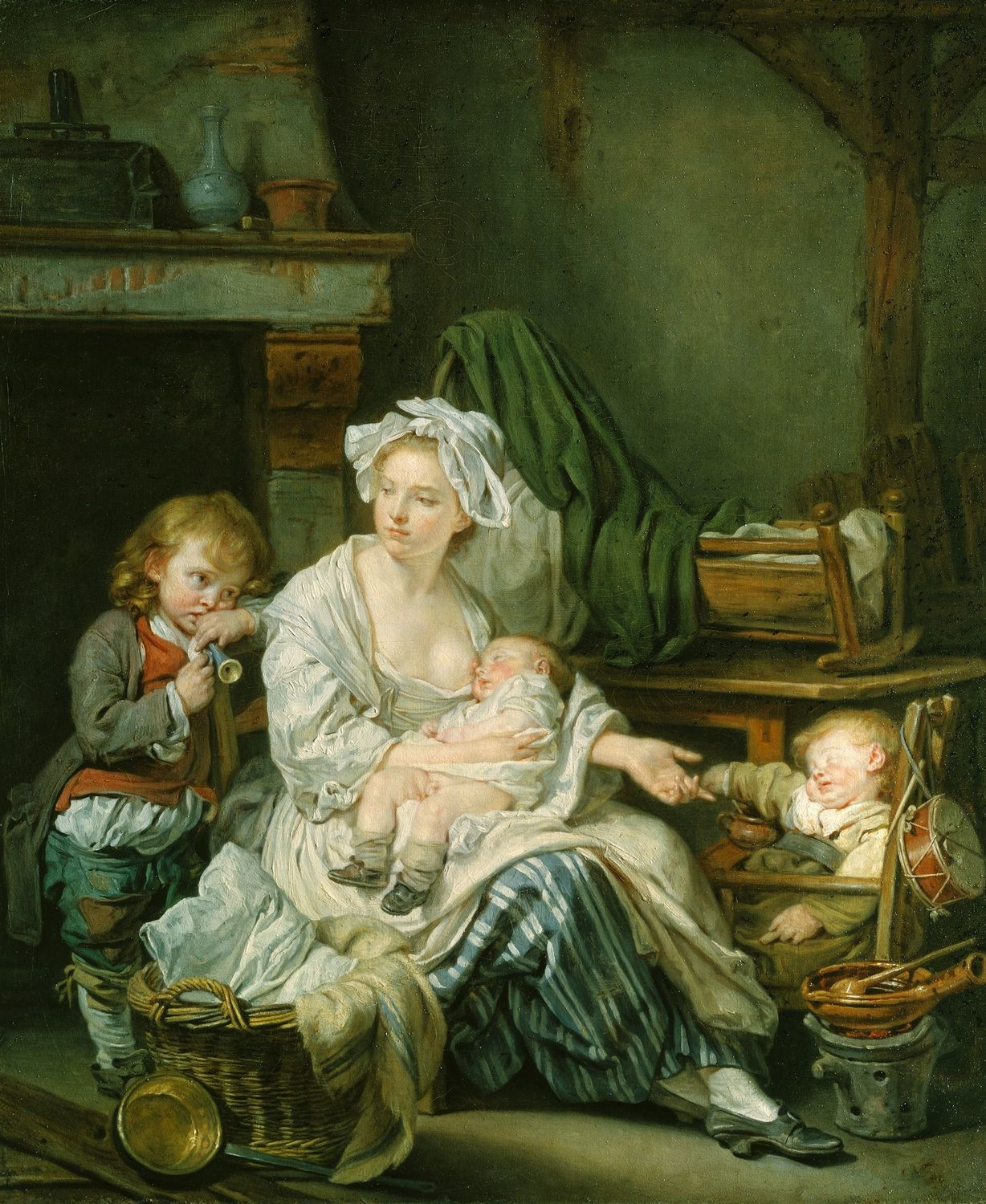
Silence! by Jean-Baptiste Greuze

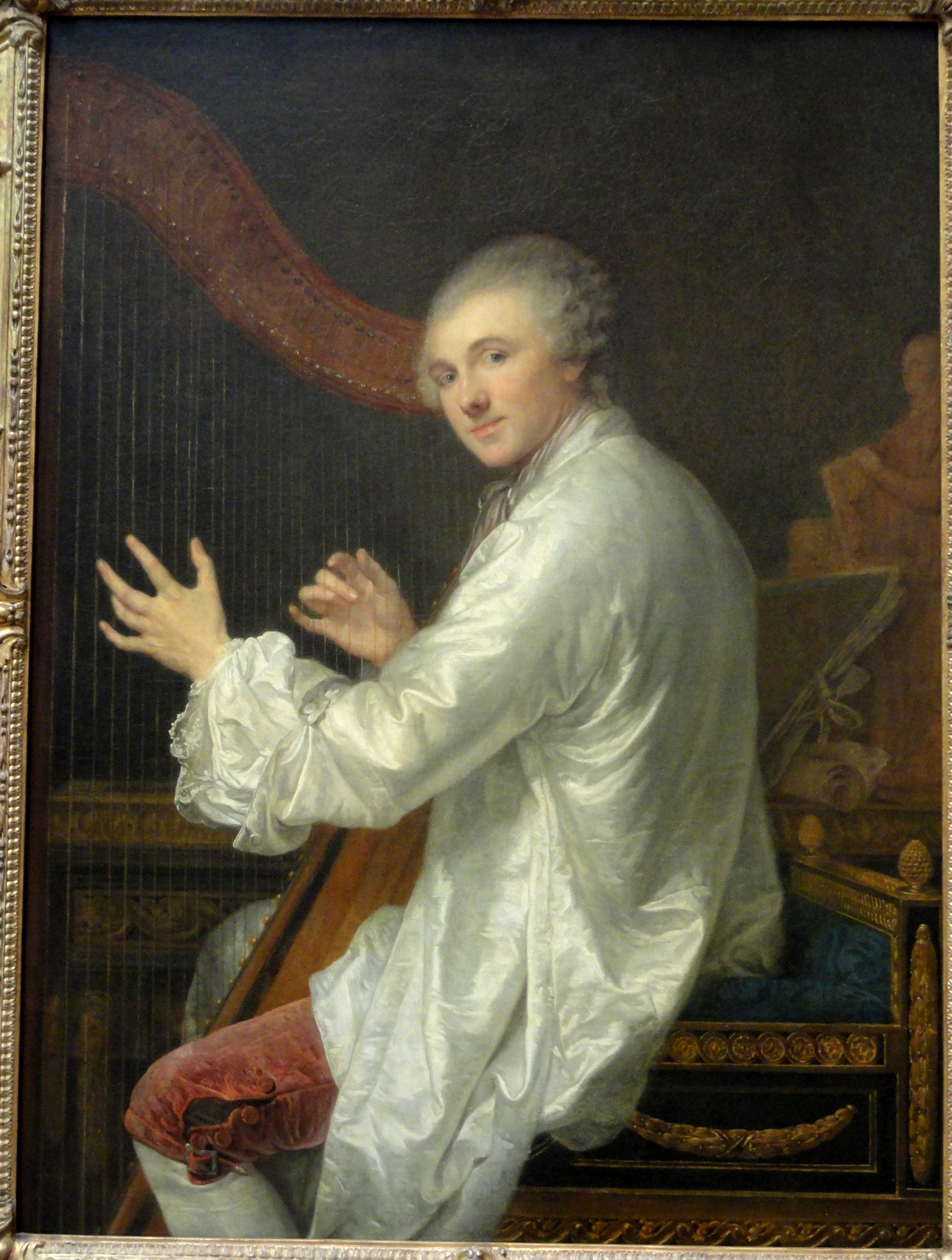
Portrait of Ange Laurent Lalive de Jully by Jean-Baptiste Greuze

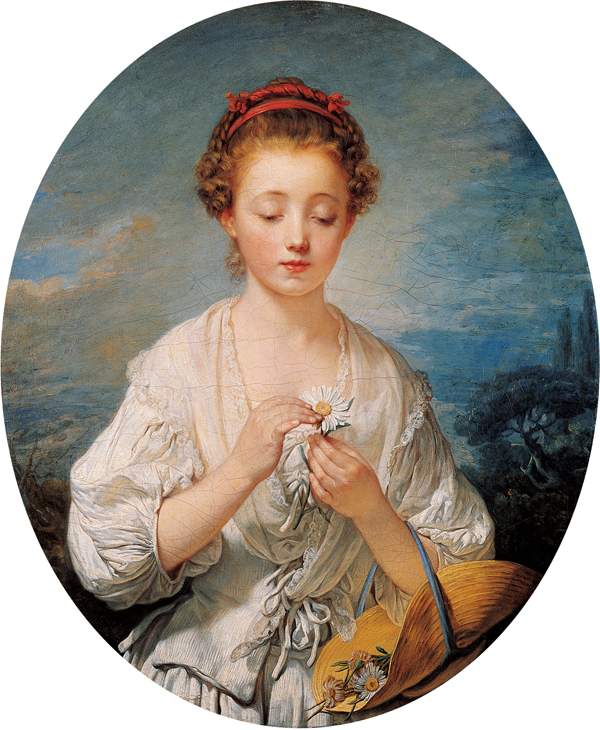
Simplicity by Jean-Baptiste Greuze

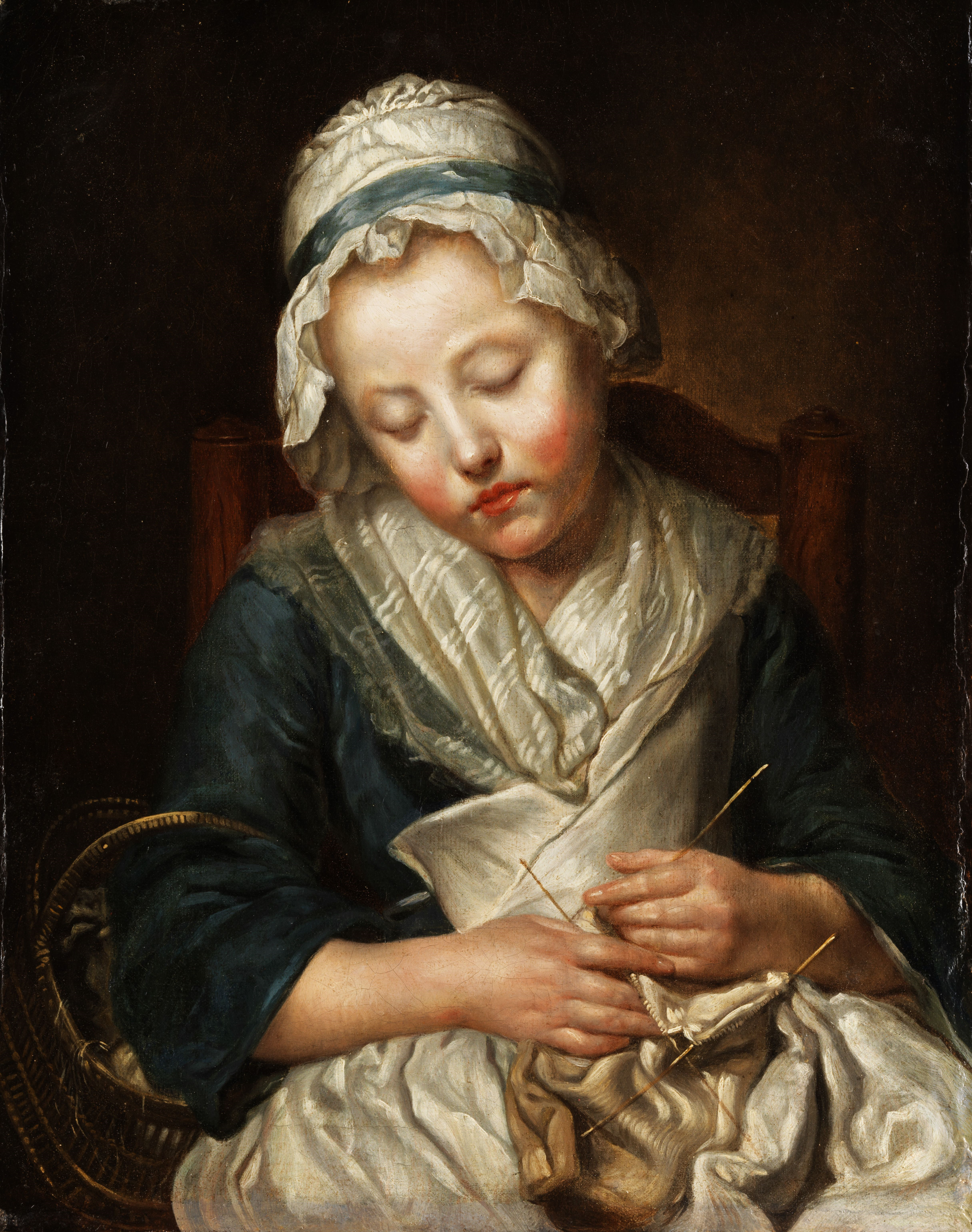
Young Knitter Asleep by Jean-Baptiste Greuze

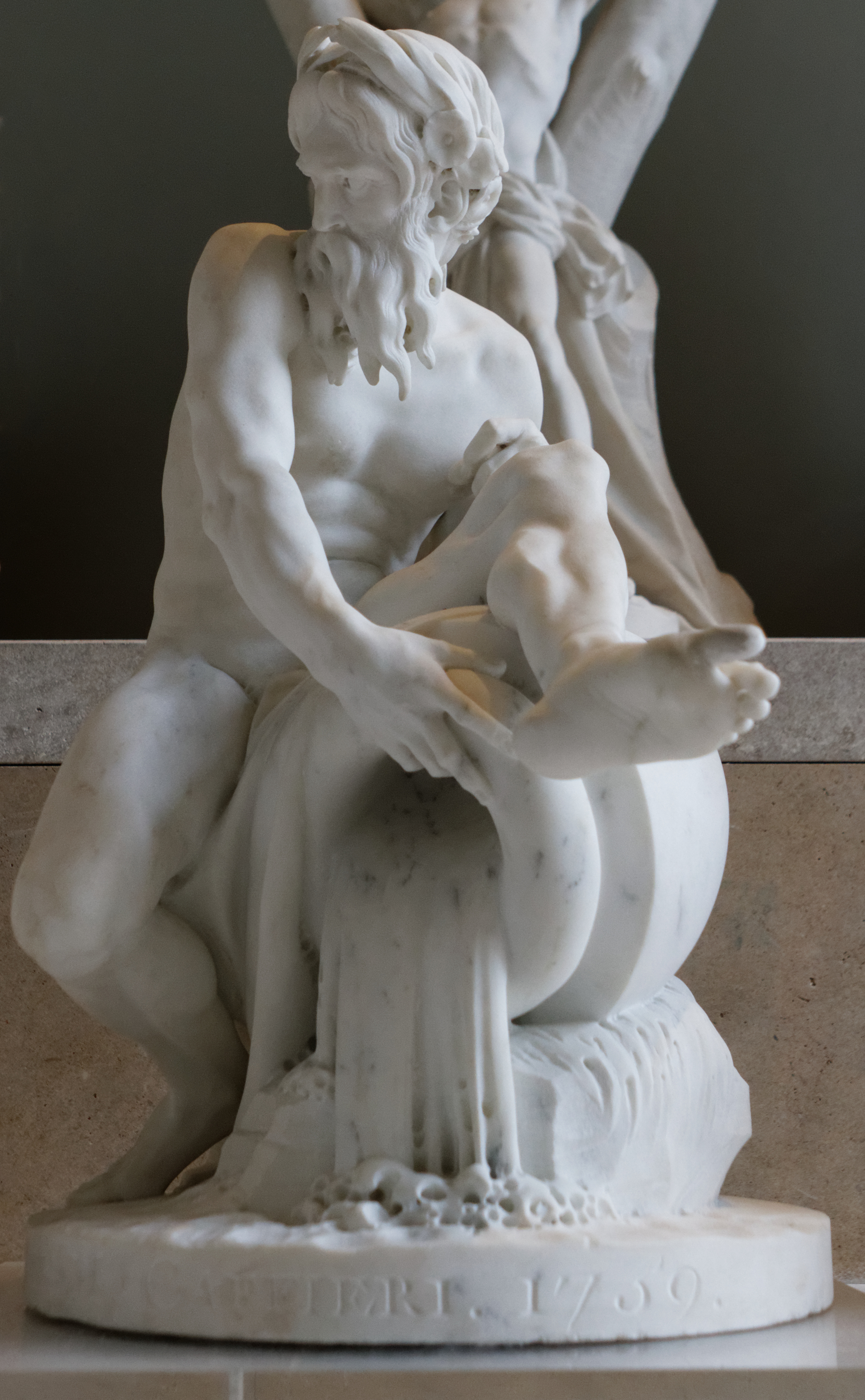
Un fleuve by Jean-Jacques Caffieri

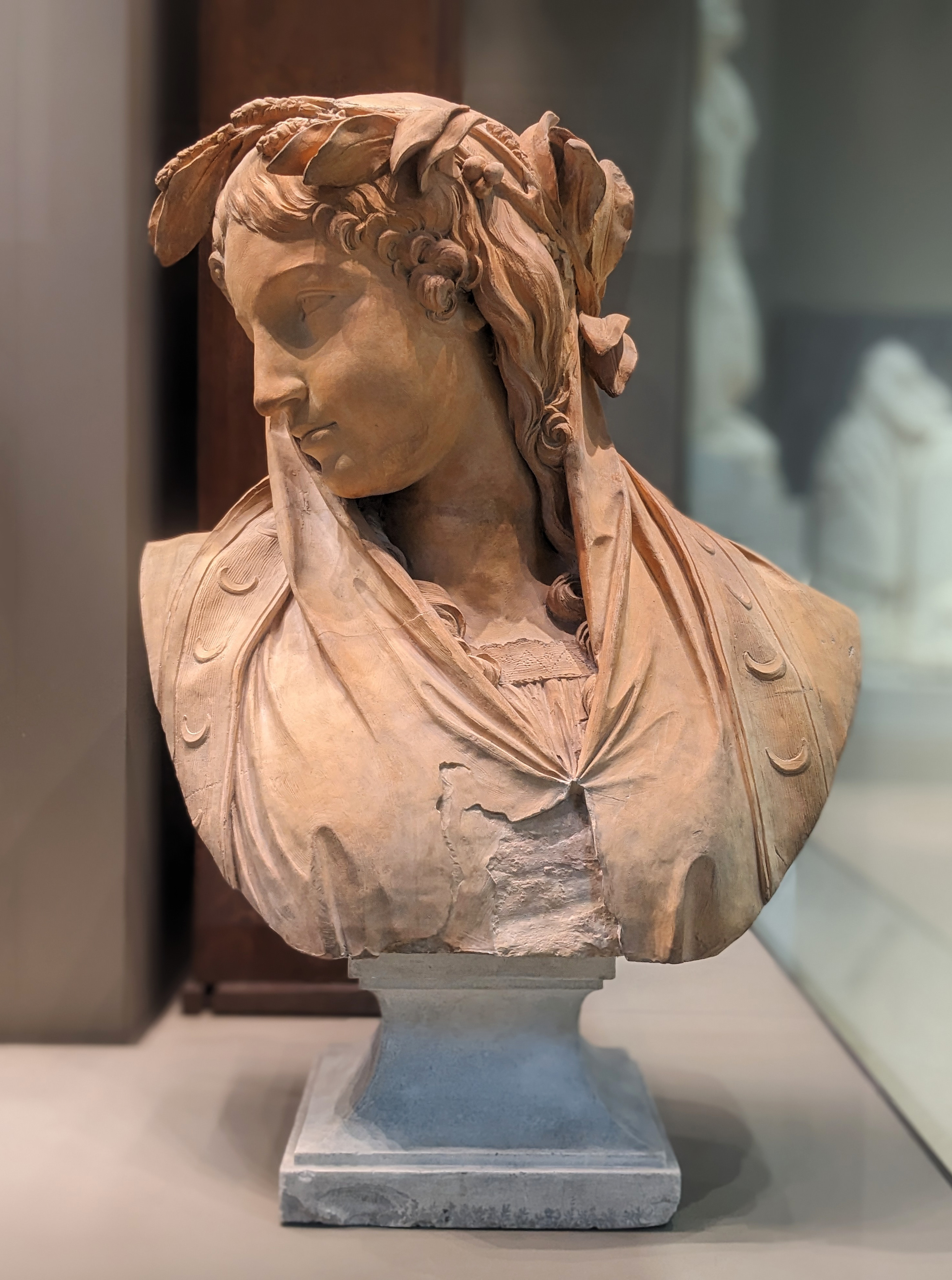
Iphigénie by Michel-Ange Slodtz

== See also ==
- Salon of 1761, the subsequent Salon held at the Louvre

== Bibliography ==
- Baetjer, Katharine. French Paintings in The Metropolitan Museum of Art from the Early Eighteenth Century through the Revolution. Metropolitan Museum of Art, 2019.
- Bailey, Colin B. The Age of Watteau, Chardin, and Fragonard: Masterpieces of French Genre Painting. Yale University Press, 2003.
- Kromm, Jane. The Art of Frenzy: Public Madness in the Visual Culture of Europe, 1500-1850. Bloomsbury Publishing, 2003.
- Levey, Michael. Painting and Sculpture in France, 1700-1789. Yale University Press, 1993.
- Woodall, Joanna. Portraiture: Facing the Subject. Manchester University Press, 1996.
