= Marie-Gabriel-Florent-Auguste de Choiseul-Gouffier =

French diplomat (1752–1817)

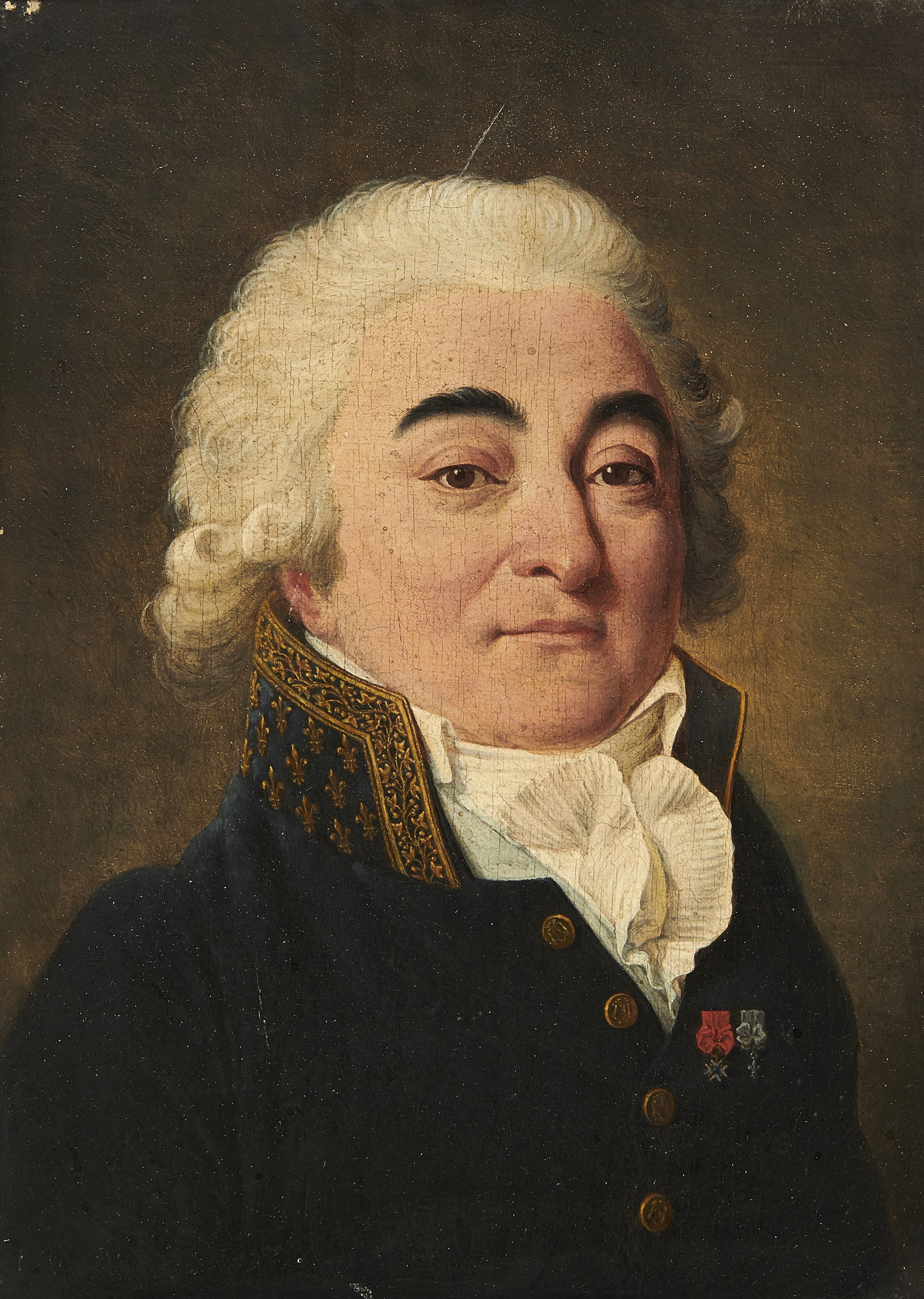
Choiseul-Gouffier

Marie-Gabriel-Florent-Auguste de Choiseul (27 September 1752, Paris – 20 June 1817, Aix-la-Chapelle), called Auguste de Choiseul-Gouffier (/ˌʃwɑːzʊlˈɡuːfieɪ/), was a French diplomat and aristocrat from the Gouffier branch of the Choiseul family. A member of the Académie française, he served as French ambassador to the Ottoman Empire from 1784 until the fall of the French monarchy and was a scholar of ancient Greece.

== Biography ==
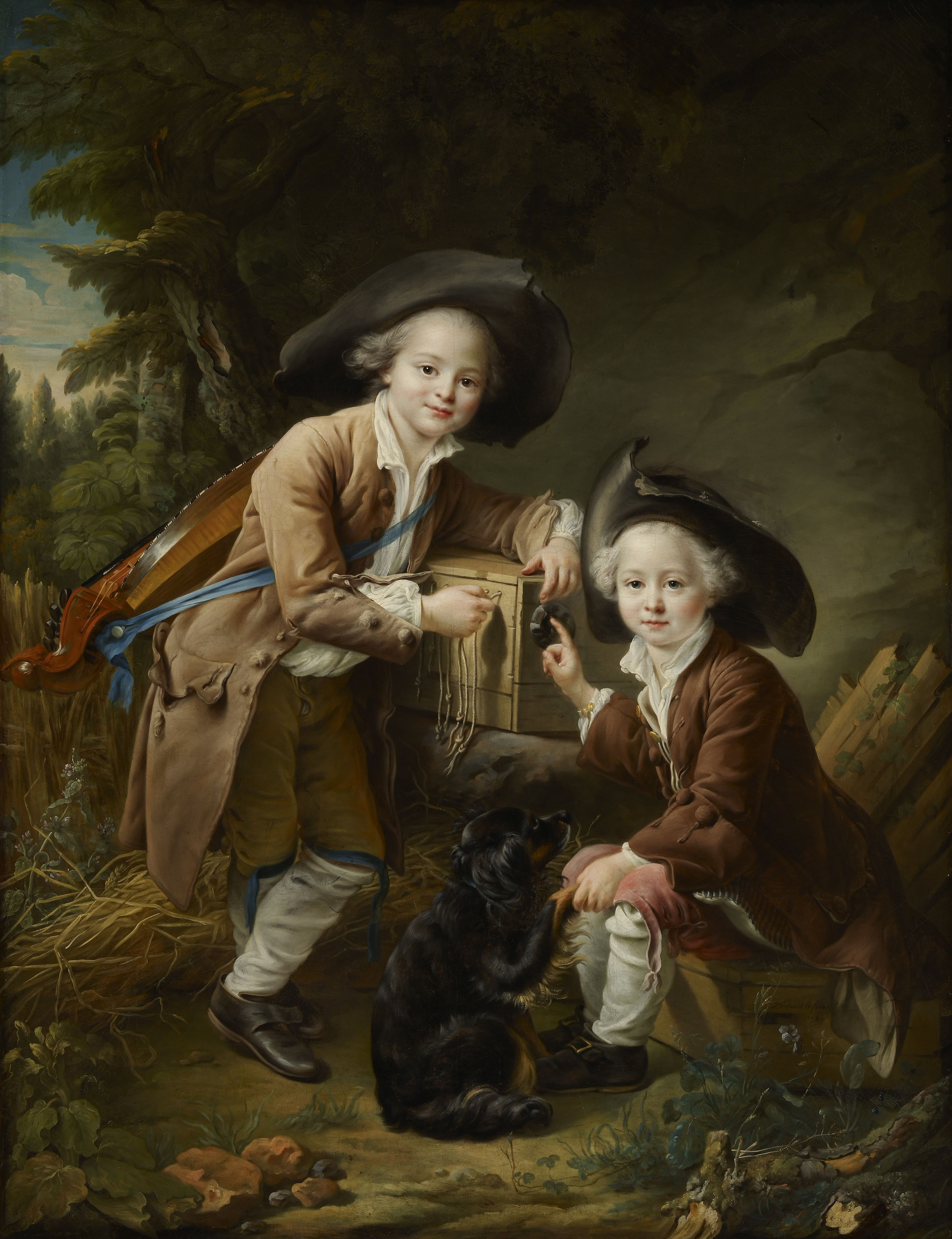
The Comte and Chevalier de Choiseul as Savoyards by François-Hubert Drouais, 1758

From his studies at the collège d'Harcourt, he developed a passion for antiquities. He was particularly marked by frequent meetings with Jean-Jacques Barthélemy, author of Voyage d'Anarcharsis, whom he met at the home of his cousin, the duc de Choiseul. Another friend was Talleyrand, with whom he participated in court intrigues and who dissuaded him from taking up the religious life.

In 1776, he left for Greece on board the frigate Atalante, commanded by Joseph Bernard de Chabert, marquis of Chabert, who was interested in astronomy. With painters and architects in tow, Choiseul-Gouffier thus visited the south Peloponnese, the Cyclades and other Aegean islands, then moved on to Asia Minor. The journey also had a political goal: to explain the situation in the Aegean between the Ottoman Empire and Imperial Russia. On his return, he published the first volume of his Voyage pittoresque de la Grèce, a great success that helped launch his intellectual and political career. He became a member of the Académie des inscriptions et belles-lettres in 1782, then a member of the Académie française in 1783. He served as ambassador to Constantinople from 1784 to 1791, taking advantage of the opportunity to discover Greece. In Constantinople, he gathered about him a semi-formal academy where gentlemen engaged in recording the beauties and treasures of the city.

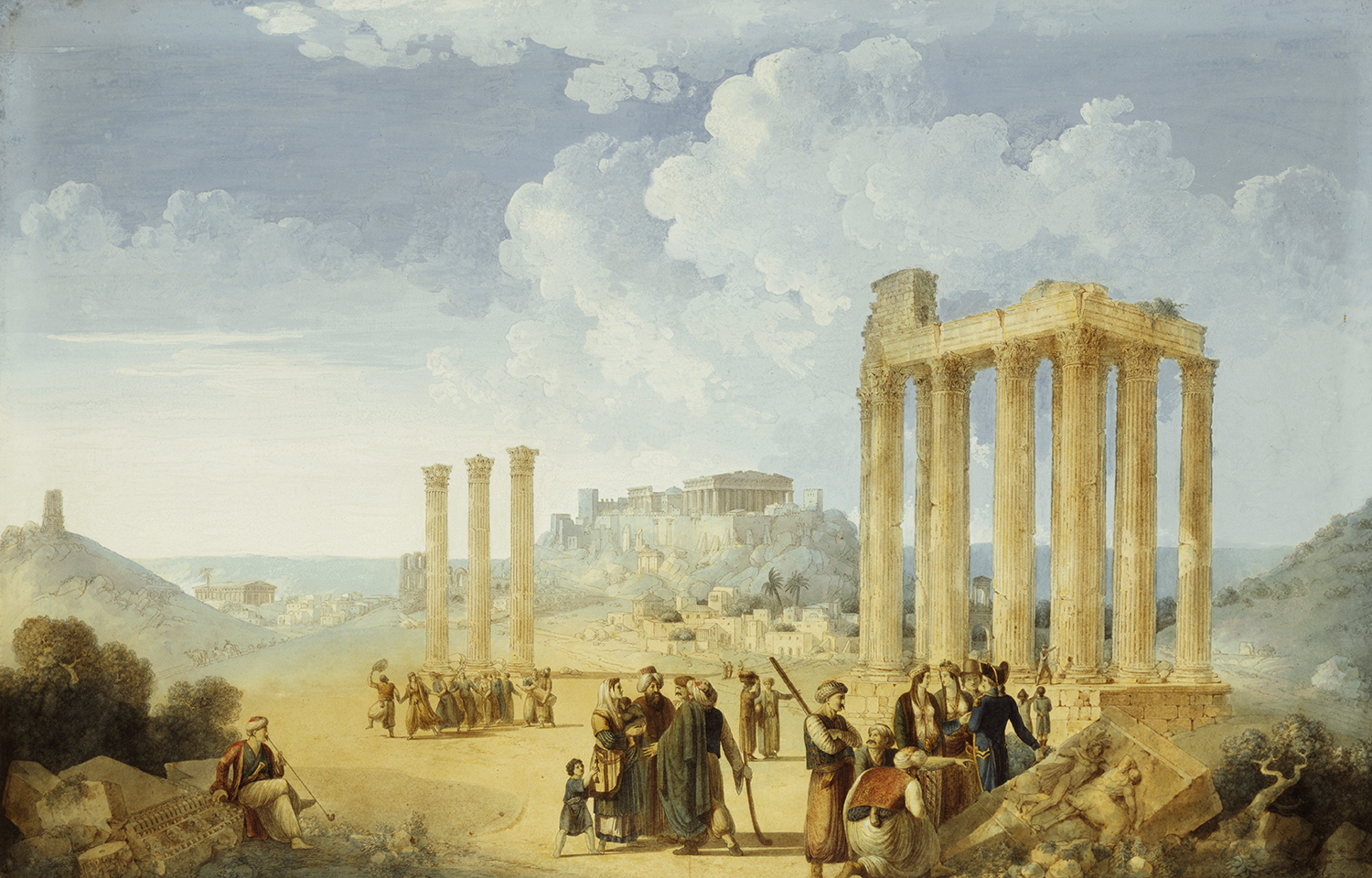
Choiseul-Gouffier at the Temple of Olympian Zeus in Athens, where members of his entourage study archaeological findings on site, 1787, painted by Louis-François Cassas

Choiseul-Gouffier visited Athens, where he coveted the Parthenon's metopes, and removed antiquities from the Acropolis and sent to France part of the Parthenon's frieze which was two metres long, and was part of the sculpture collection he bequeathed on his death to the Louvre, where it now resides. He was aided in his actions by the French consul Louis Fauvel to whom he gave clear instructions: 'Remove everything you can. Do not neglect any opportunity to plunder in Athens and in its territory all that can be plundered. Spare neither the dead nor the living.' His marble bust of Marcus Aurelius, found by Fauvel in Attica in 1789, was sold in 1818; it was later acquired by the Musée du Louvre, whilst an Apollo previously owned by him is now in the British Museum.

The French Revolution changed the course of his life. Refusing to obey the Convention, he refused his recall to France for fear of being guillotined. French authorities seized his goods, and another envoy was sent to replace him. After a year under siege in the embassy, Choiseul Gouffier emigrated to Russia in 1792, where he was named Director of the Academy of Arts and Imperial Public Library of Russia. Empress Catherine the Great became friends with him and gave him lands and a domain in Lithuania, where he built a palace. (His descendants lived in Lithuania until 1945, when, hunted by the Communists, the last of the Choiseul-Gouffiers fled to Switzerland and died there in 1949.)

He returned to France only after Napoleon's amnesty for exiled nobles at the start of the First Empire in 1802. Finding his friend Talleyrand, he refused to participate in the government of the Empire and remained faithful to Louis XVIII. He published the second volume of his Voyage pittoresque de la Grèce in 1809 and built himself a house imitating the Erechtheion. He was named a Minister of France and Peer of France upon the Bourbon Restoration. Excluded from the Académie française for having emigrated, he regained his seat in 1816. The third volume of his Voyage pittoresque de la Grèce was published posthumously in 1822.

== Works ==
He published his impressions as Voyage Pittoresque en Grèce (Brussels 1782), often reprinted, and republished as late as 1842, as Voyage pittoresque dans l’Empire Ottomane. It presented many little-known monuments, set in an idealised Greece crushed by Ottoman domination and desiring to rediscover and reawaken its liberty. Several other travellers dismantled this romantic vision of modern-day Greece at the start of the 19th century. Like them, he suggested one should go see these sites in person to better comprehend the ancient authors, walking round sites with their texts in one's hand, "to feel more deeply the different beauties of the pictures traced by Homer, by seeing the images he had in his eyes" ("pour sentir plus vivement les beautés différentes des tableaux tracés par Homère en voyant les images qu'il avait eues sous les yeux"). His narrative allowed readers to discover previously unknown regions of Greece, such as the Cyclades. He asked his protégé, the painter Lancelot-Théodore Turpin de Crissé, to produce the engravings for the second volume.

His other works include a Dissertation sur Homère, a mémoire on hippodrome at Olympia, and Recherches sur l'origine du Bosphore de Thrace.

Diplomatic posts
Preceded by François Emmanuel Guignard	Ambassador to the Ottoman Empire; 1784–1792	Succeeded by Charles Louis Huguet in name only
