= Chabbert =

Chabbert is a surname. Notable people with the surname include:

- Jean Chabbert (1920–2016), French prelate of the Roman Catholic Church
- Sébastien Chabbert (born 1978), French football player

== See also ==
- Chabert
