= Choiseul-Gouffier Apollo =

Marble statue

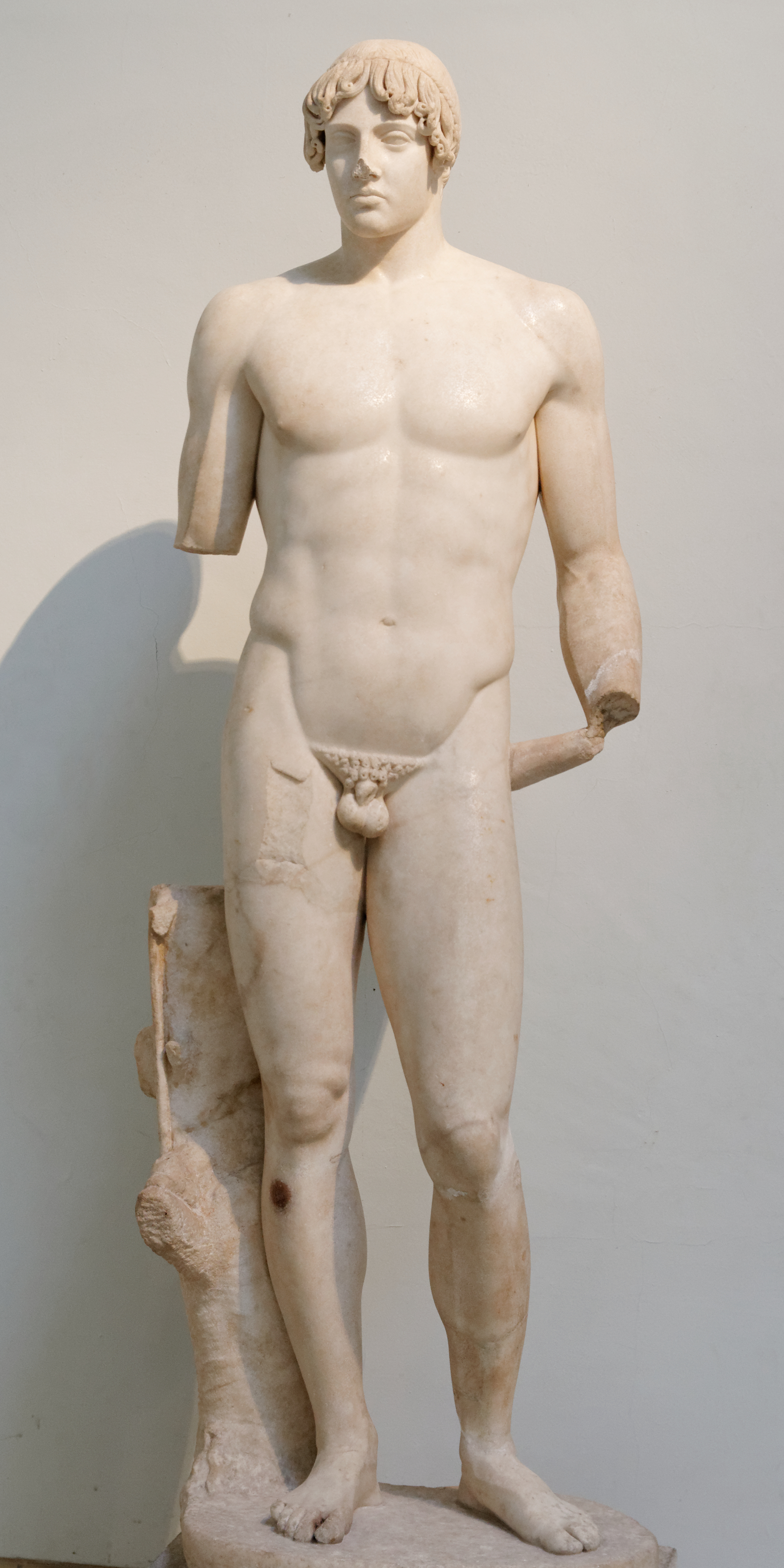
The Choiseul-Gouffier Apollo in the British Museum

The Choiseul-Gouffier Apollo is a lifesize (1.82 m tall) marble statue formerly in the collection of the comte Marie-Gabriel-Florent-Auguste de Choiseul-Gouffier (1752–1817), member of the Académie Française and French ambassador to the Sublime Porte from 1784 until the fall of the monarchy. It is now conserved in the British Museum.

The nude sculpture of a naked youth, perhaps representing the god Apollo or a victorious athlete, is an Imperial Roman copy, dated 1st century AD, of a Greek bronze original that would have dated, judging from its style, about 460–450 BCE. The sculpture retains characteristic traits of bronze work translated into marble, such as the carving of the locks of hair, which on the bronze original would have been individually cast attached. The tree stump support on the statue's right and the strut attaching the left arm to the leg are both reinforcements to the marble version, which was more fragile than the bronze original.
