= View of Avignon from the Right Bank of the Rhone =

Painting by Claude-Joseph Vernet

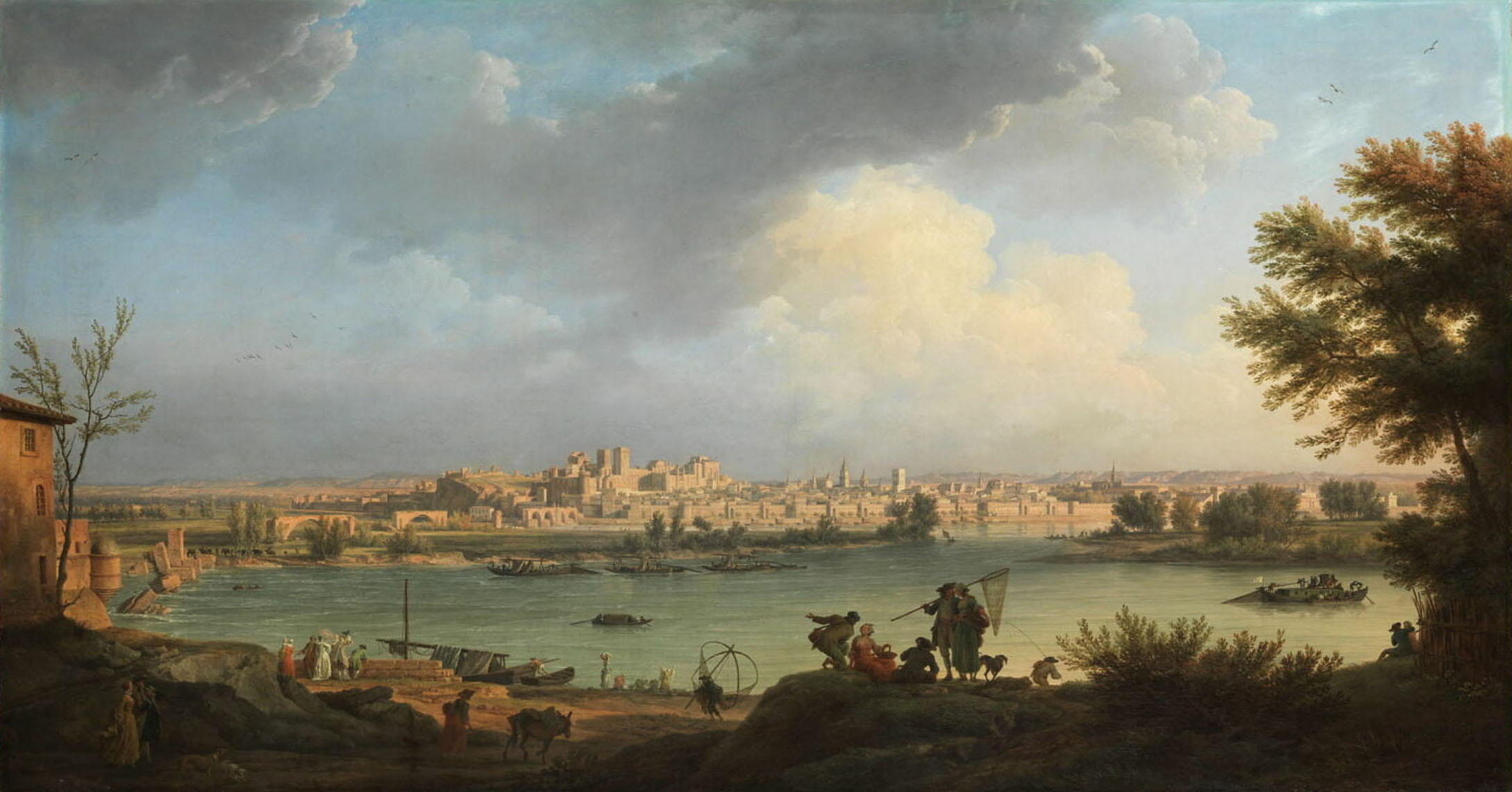
- Artist: Claude-Joseph Vernet
- Year: 1757
- Type: Oil on canvas, landscape painting
- Dimensions: 99 cm × 182 cm (39 in × 72 in)
- Location: Louvre; Paris

View of Avignon from the Right Bank of the Rhone (French: Vue d'Avignon, depuis la rive droite du Rhône, près de Villeneuve) is an oil on canvas landscape painting by the French artist Claude-Joseph Vernet, from 1757. It is held at the Louvre, in Paris.

== History and description ==
It features a view across the River Rhône of the city of Avignon in Provence. Located in Southern France, it was at the time an exclave controlled by the Papal States.

The view is taken from the right bank of the river, close to the Tour Philippe-le-Bel, while the remains of the Pont Saint-Bénézet are visible on the left. Vernet was himself a native of Avignon. At the time he was in the process of producing his Views of the Ports of France series of paintings commissioned by Louis XV. This work, although stylistically similar, was commissioned by Pierre-Gabriel Peilhon in 1851, and depicts a riverscape rather than a seaport. Vernet probably began the painting when he stayed in Avignon between July and October 1856. Peilhon paid 1,500 livres for the painting in 1757. It was exhibited at the Salon of 1759 held at the Louvre in Paris. The painting was auctioned in 2013 at Sotheby's for £5.3 million. It was acquired by the French state and is now part of the collection of the Louvre.

== Sources ==
- Ingersoll-Smouse, Florence (1926). Joseph Vernet, peintre de marine, 1714-1789: étude critique suivie d'un catalogue raisonné de son oeuvre peint, avec trois cent cinquante-sept reproductions. Vol. 1. Paris: Étienne Bignou.
