= Chabert =

Chabert is a French surname. Notable people with the surname include:

- Alfred Chabert (1836–1916), French botanist
- Cédric Chabert (born 1973), French former footballer
- Lacey Chabert (born 1982), American actress and voice actress
- Norby Chabert (born 1976), American politician
- Théodore Chabert (1758–1845), French general of the French Revolutionary Wars and Napoleonic Wars
- Philibert Chabert (1737–1814), French agronomist and veterinarian

== See also ==
- Le Colonel Chabert (disambiguation)
- Daniel-Marie Chabert de Joncaire de Clausonne
- Louis-Thomas Chabert de Joncaire
- Philippe-Thomas Chabert de Joncaire
