= The Comte and Chevalier de Choiseul as Savoyards =

Painting by François-Hubert Drouais

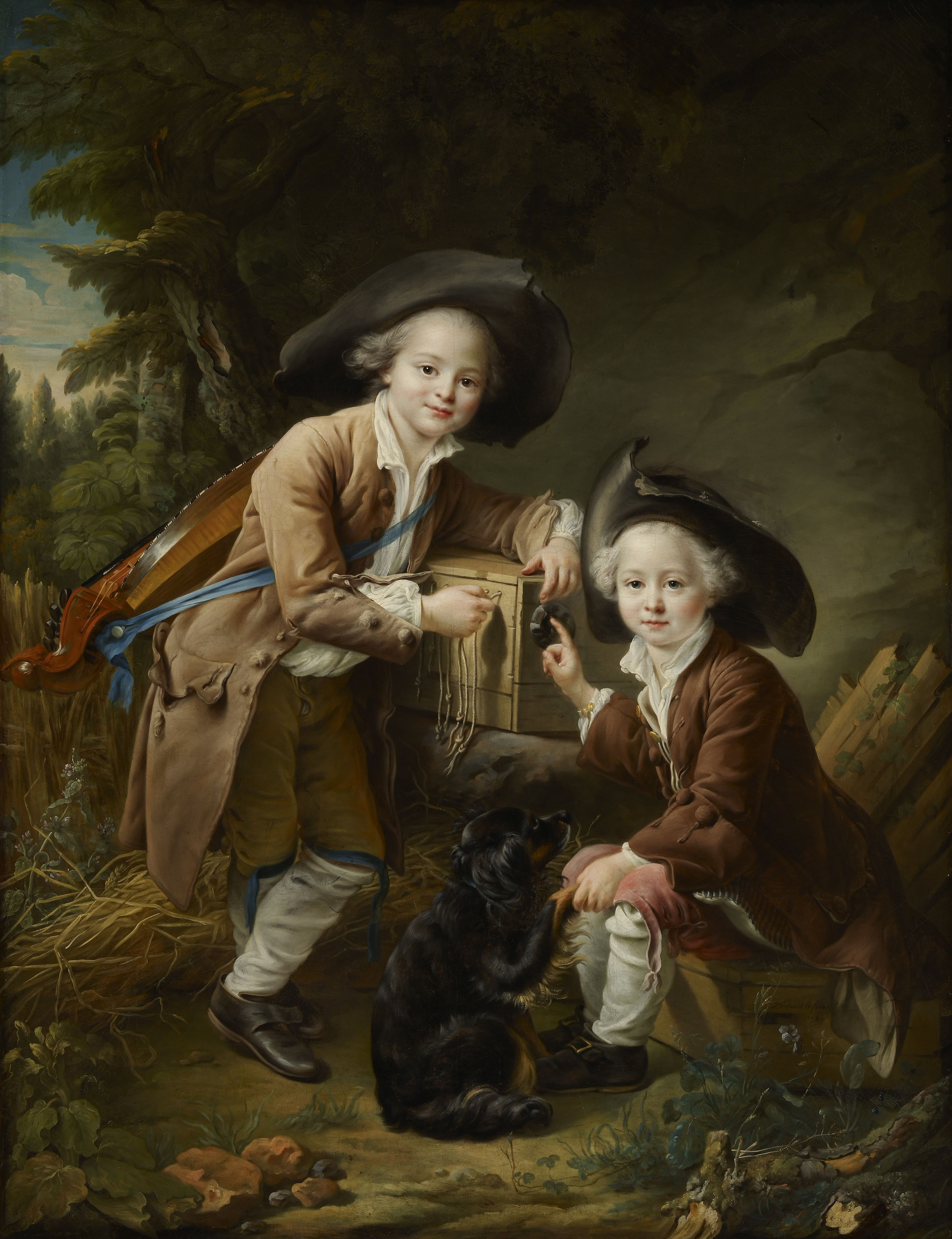
- Artist: François-Hubert Drouais
- Year: 1758
- Type: Oil on canvas, portrait painting
- Dimensions: 139.4 cm × 107.6 cm (54.9 in × 42.4 in)
- Location: Frick Collection; New York City

The Comte and Chevalier de Choiseul as Savoyards is an oil on canvas portrait painting by the French artist François-Hubert Drouais, from 1758. It is held at the Frick Collection, in New York, which acquired it in 1966.

== History and description ==
It depicts two young members of the French Aristocracy, dressed in the costume of Savoyard itinerate entertainers who toured France in the era. The elder of the two, shown standing with a hurdy-gurdy on his back is the six-year old Marie-Gabriel-Florent-Auguste de Choiseul-Gouffier. His younger brother Michel-Félix-Victor, Chevalier de Choiseul-Daillecourt is shown pointing at a peep show. A docile setter is shown at their feet.

They were cousins of the French statesman the Duke of Choiseul, best known for leading France during the Seven Years' War. Drouais was a celebrated portraitist of the Ancien régime who flourished during the reign of Louis XV. The painting was displayed at the Salon of 1759 at the Louvre, in Paris.

== Bibliography ==
- Tadie, Alexis & O'Quinn, Daniel. Sporting Cultures, 1650–1850. University of Toronto Press, 2018.
- Wintermute, Alan & Garstang, Donald . The French portrait, 1550-1850. University of Washington Press, 2009.
