= Guillaume Voiriot =

French painter (1712–1799)

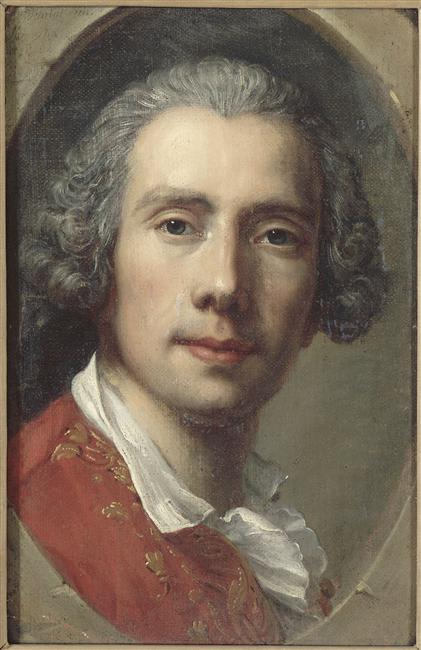
Guillaume Voiriot, Self-portrait, ca. 1749

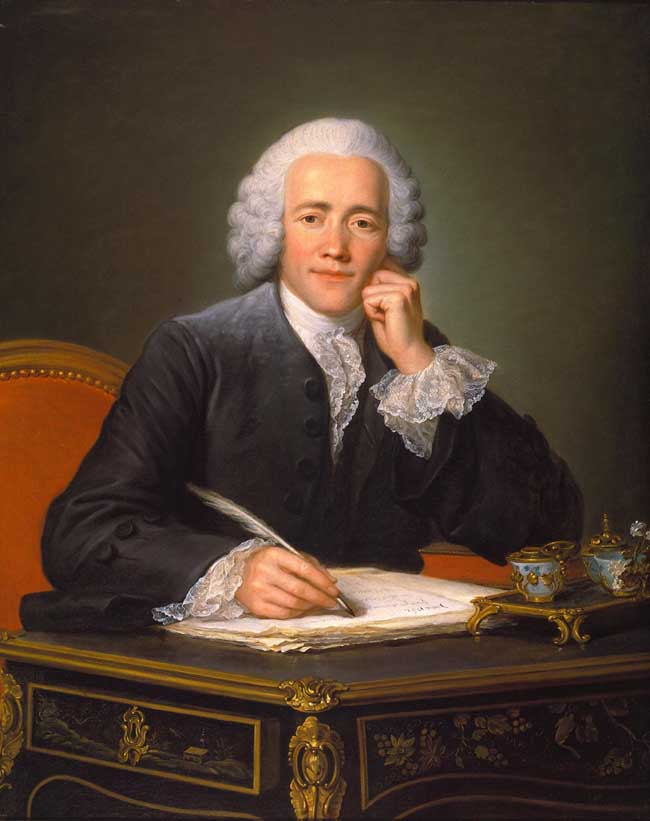
Portrait of M. Gilbert de Voisins, Councillor of State in Ordinary, 1761

Guillaume Voiriot (English: /vwɑːriˈoʊ/ vwah-ree-OH, French: [ɡijom vwaʁjo]; 20 November 1712 – 9 December 1799) was a French portrait painter.

== Biography ==
Voiriot was born in Paris into a family originally from Lorraine; his father was a sculptor. He travelled to Italy at his own expense from 1746 to 1749, studying at the French Academy in Rome. On his return he initially joined the Académie de Saint-Luc as a pastellist, then in 1759 was accepted into the Académie royale de peinture et de sculpture as a painter in oils, on the strength of portraits of the painters Jean-Baptiste Marie Pierre and Jean-Marc Nattier. From then until 1771, he regularly exhibited portraits in the Paris Salons.

Voiriot was a friend of the architect Michel-Barthélemy Hazon; they had travelled to Rome together. Through him he made contacts in Normandy that led to a number of portraits. From 1770, he was an associate of the Academy of Arts in Rouen.

After 1771, he exhibited less often, concentrating on administrative tasks while continuing to paint family members, scientists, writers, actors and musicians. He died in Paris.

The catalogue assembled by Catherine Voiriot lists 67 surviving works, 8 works known from engravings, and 37 works mentioned by sources. Some of his portraits are unusually lively. Some of the lost works were early copies after Georges de La Tour; it is possible that some of those that survive are misattributed to de La Tour or others.

== Bibliography ==
- Catherine Voiriot. "Voiriot Guillaume (1712–1799), portraitiste de l'Académie royale de peinture et de sculpture". In: Bulletin de la Société de l'Histoire de l'Art français, 2004 issue (2005) 111–57 (in French)
