= Philibert Chabert =

French agronoist and veterinarian

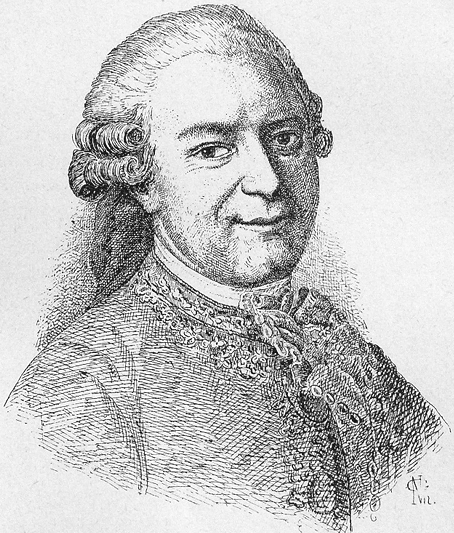
Philibert Chabert

Philibert Chabert (6 January 1737 – 8 September 1814) was a French agronomist and veterinarian. He was an important educator and director and the École National Vétérinaire d'Alfort, where he greatly increased the school's important anatomy and natural history cabinet. In 1774, he wrote a treatise on methods to control an anthrax epizootic occurring in Saint-Domingue.
