= Colonel Chabert =

Colonel Chabert may refer to:

- Colonel Chabert (novel), an 1832 novella by French novelist and playwright Honoré de Balzac,

or any of its many adaptations:

- Le Colonel Chabert (Colonel Chabert), a 1911 French film directed by André Calmettes and Henri Pouctal;
- Oberst Chabert (Colonel Chabert), a 1912 German opera composed by Hermann Wolfgang von Waltershausen (1882–1954);
- Il Colonnello Chabert (Colonel Chabert), a 1920 Italian film directed by Carmine Gallone, starring Charles Le Bargy and Rita Pergament;
- Mensch ohne Namen (Man Without a Name), a 1932 German film directed by Gustav Ucicky, starring Werner Krauss, Mathias Wieman, Hans Brausewetter and Helene Thimig;
- Le Colonel Chabert (Colonel Chabert), a 1943 Vichy French film directed by René Le Hénaff, starring Raimu;
- Полковник Шабер (Colonel Chabert), a 1978 Russian television film directed by Irina Sorokina, starring Vladislav Strzhelchik, Oleg Basilashvili, Mikhail Boyarsky;
- Le Colonel Chabert (Colonel Chabert), a 1994 French film directed by Yves Angelo.
