= The Lady of Charity =

Painting by Jean-Baptiste Greuze

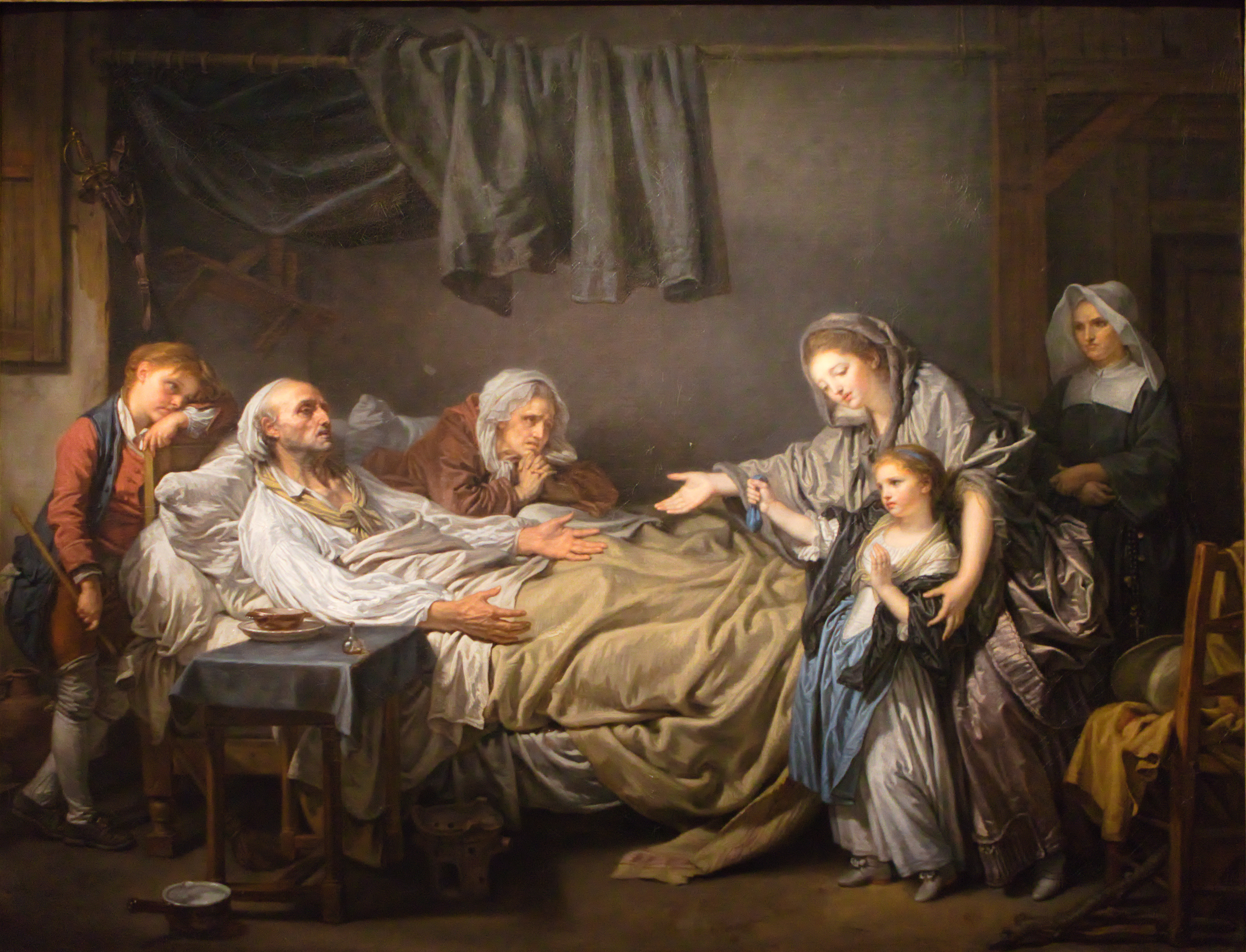
- Artist: Jean-Baptiste Greuze
- Year: 1773
- Medium: Oil on canvas
- Dimensions: 112 cm × 146 cm (44 in × 57 in)
- Location: Museum of Fine Arts of Lyon, Lyon

The Lady of Charity (French - La Dame de charité) is a 1773 oil-on-canvas painting by Jean-Baptiste Greuze, now in the Museum of Fine Arts of Lyon. It shows a wealthy lady encouraging her young daughter to give alms to a dying old man.

== Context ==
Greuze lived in a period of change, between the reigns of Louis XV and Louis XVI. After artistic studies in Lyon then in Paris, Greuze exhibited in the Salon of the Royal Academy of Fine Arts for the first time in 1755, where he showed The Father explaining the Bible to his Children and three other paintings. On his return from Rome, where he went to complete his training, his success was recognized. The French Academy therefore asked him to create a masterpiece for the next Salon. Greuze chose to present Septimius Severus and Caracalla, but he only met with criticism contrary to his expectations. For the Academy, Greuze was "incapable of painting the passions or representing history with the desired nobility and grandeur". Frustrated, he no longer exhibited at the Salon.

He retained the favor of the public and critics thanks to his portraits and engravings which he continued to present. A large part of Greuze's works illustrated the delights of virtue. It was in this precise context that he painted The Lady of Charity, which enjoyed immense success. This painting marked the advent of a sentimental and preaching genre that would survive until the end of the following century. This didactic work owes its success to the rise of a bourgeois moralist mentality which did not spare the noble class. Diderot, the famous writer, a great admirer of Greuze, described him as an artist of morality: "Here is our painter and mine, the first among us who thought of giving mores to art".
