= The Broken Vessel =

Painting by Jean-Baptiste Greuze

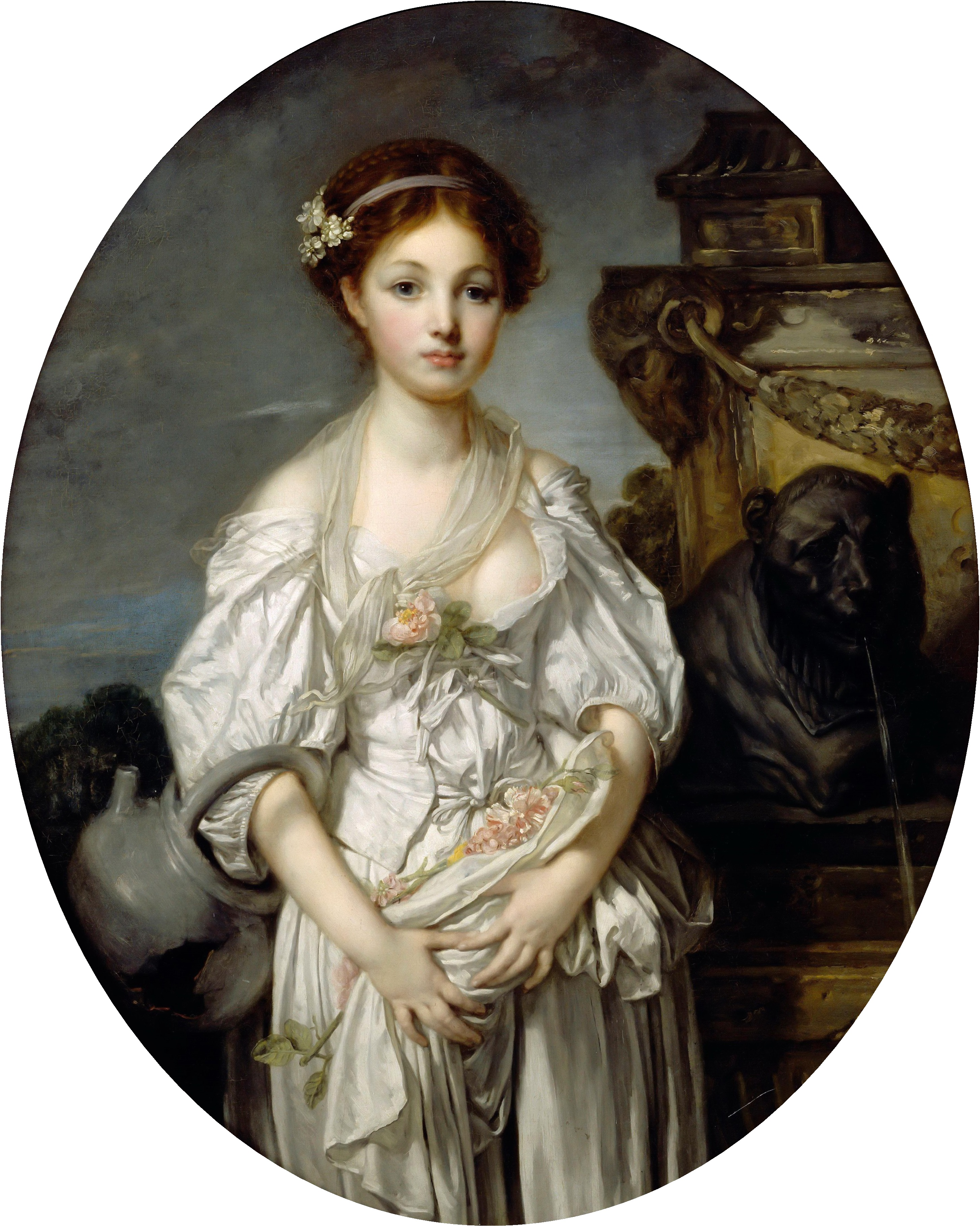
- Artist: Jean-Baptiste Greuze
- Year: c. 1771–1772
- Medium: Oil on canvas
- Dimensions: 109 cm × 87 cm (43 in × 34 in)
- Location: Louvre; Paris

The Broken Vessel is an oil on canvas painting by French painter Jean-Baptiste Greuze, created c. 1771–1772. It is one of the most famous works by the artist. It is held in the Louvre, in Paris.

== Description ==
In a vertical oval-shaped painting, the only character represented is a young girl dressed in a low-cut white dress with balloon sleeves. She is holding an armful of roses in one side of her apron, she also wears a ribbon with three flowers, and has a rose on her bodice. She carries the broken vessel, the object of the painting, on her right arm. On her left is the fountain where the young girl had to draw water. It has the appearance of an anthropomorphic lion's head through which water flows.

On closer inspection, the girl doesn't appears to be so innocent. Her candor is a little exaggerated: her scarf is disturbed, almost revealing a breast, the roses she holds in her hands are a little unflowered and gathered at the level of her hips, while her gaze is hesitant. The fountain might be a symbol for a male relationship. We can also presume that the broken jug symbolizes her lost virginity. Greuze followed this symbolism in other paintings, like Broken Eggs and Young Girl Weeping over Her Dead Bird.

== Provenance ==
The painting came from a revolutionary seizure of the Château de Madame du Barry, in 1794, who had originally commissioned the work. It is held since then in the Louvre. A second version of the work belonged to the marquis of Verri. A preliminary sketch of the painting is also at the Louvre.

A copy of the painting in private hands was stolen by the Germans during World War II. It was entrusted to the Louvre Museum awaiting possible restitution.

== Cultural references ==
A sculpture inspired by this painting adorns the painter's tomb at the Montmartre Cemetery, in Paris.
