= Anna-Geneviève Greuze =

French artist (1762–1842)

Anna-Geneviève Greuze (sometimes Anne-Geneviève) (1762–1842) was a French painter.

Born in Paris, Greuze was the daughter and pupil of Jean-Baptiste Greuze, and lived with him until his death. She was known as a genre and portrait painter, but it is highly likely that much of her surviving work has been confused with that of her father. A handful of pastels attributed to her by family tradition survived in the collection of the descendants of sculptor Henri-Zozime de Valori until 2009.

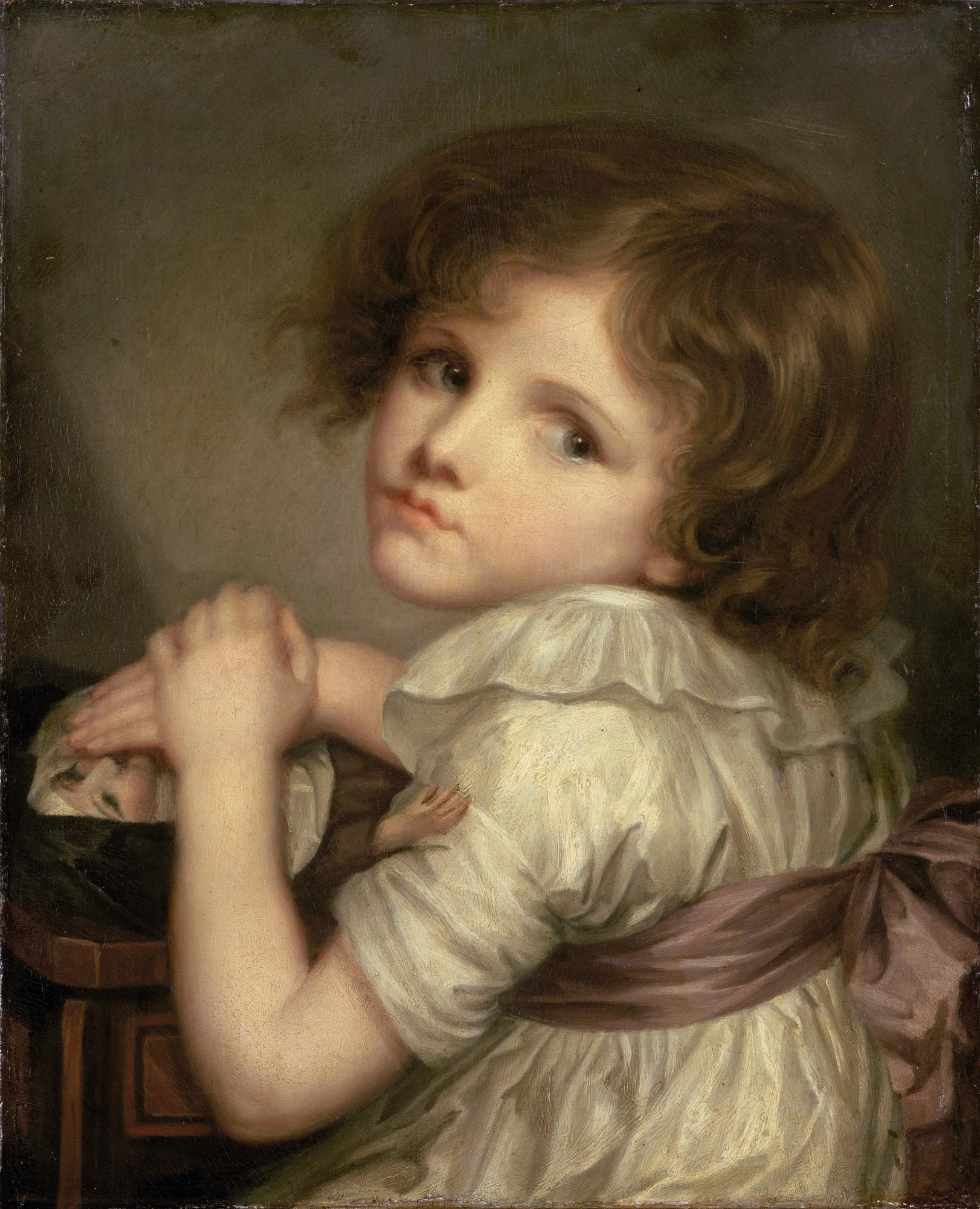
Child With a Doll, Anna-Geneviève Greuze

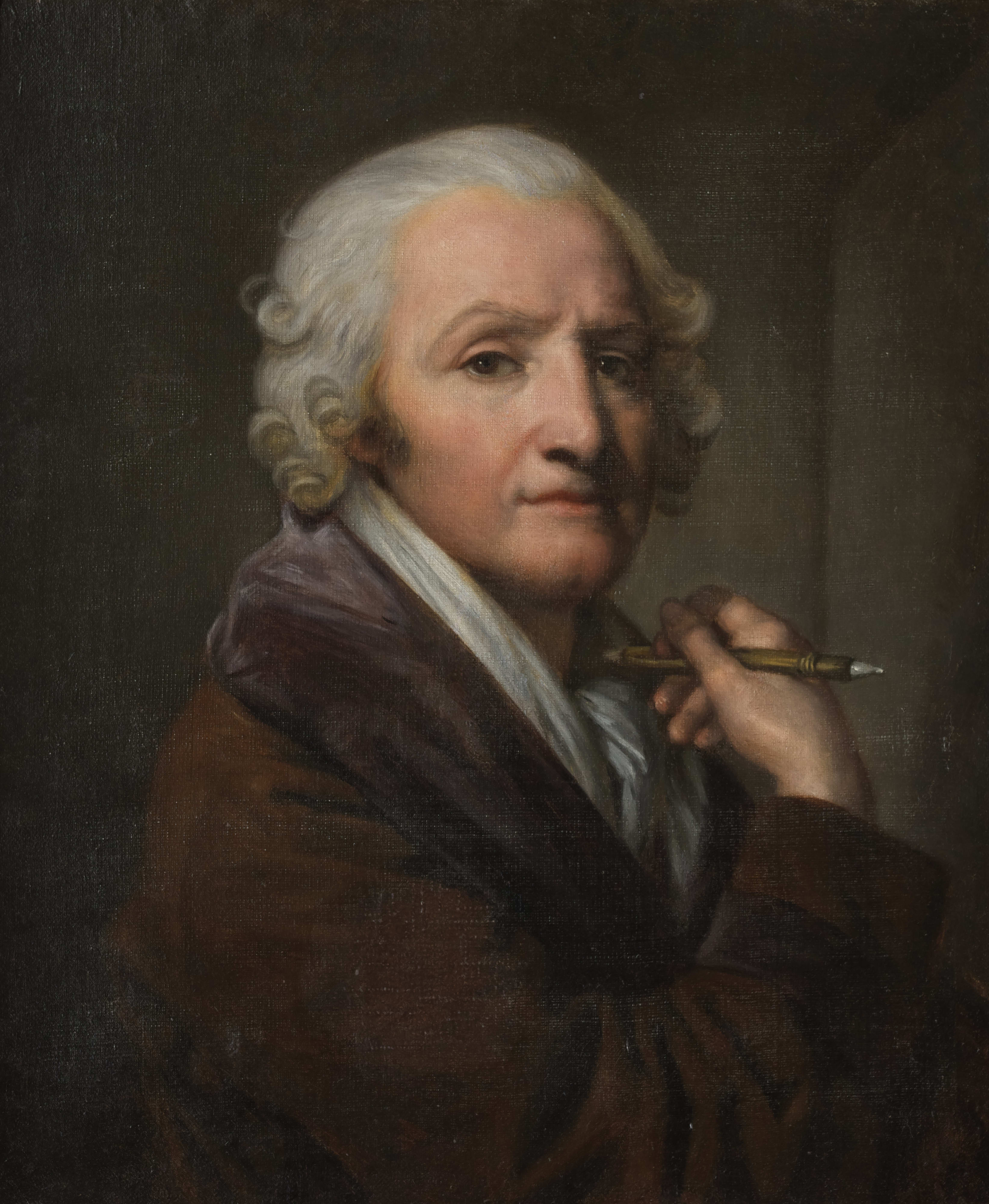
Portrait of Jean-Baptiste Greuze by his daughter Anna-Geneviève Greuze, 1804–5
