= Edgar Munhall =

American art historian

- Born: Edgar Joseph Munhall; March 14, 1933; Pittsburgh, Pennsylvania
- Died: October 17, 2016 (aged 83); New York City
- Education: Yale University, New York University
- Known for: Art historian, curator
- Awards: Officier, Ordre des Arts et des Lettres

Edgar Joseph Munhall (March 14, 1933 – October 17, 2016) was an American art historian and Curator Emeritus of the Frick Collection.

== Early life and education ==
Munhall was born in Pittsburgh, Pennsylvania. He initially trained as an artist and at the age of seventeen won a scholarship to the Art Students League in New York City to study fashion drawing. After several months, however, he opted to pursue a career in art history and matriculated at Yale University, where he graduated Phi Beta Kappa with High Honors from the "History, the Arts, and Letters" program in 1955. He transferred to New York University's Institute of Fine Arts for his master's degree, which he earned in 1957 with the thesis "The Statues in Watteau's Paintings". He returned to Yale for his PhD, writing his dissertation, which was completed in 1959, on Jean-Baptiste Greuze and his critical reception.

== Career ==
Munhall's first appointment was as Assistant Curator of Prints and Drawings at the Yale University Art Gallery. In 1964, he became an assistant professor in the Department of Art History at the university. A year later, he joined The Frick Collection as its first curator, a position he held until 1999. From 1972-1973, he also served as Acting Director of the Collection. In addition to his curatorial work, he continued to teach. He was the Clark Visiting Professor at Williams College in 1974 and served as an adjunct professor at Columbia University from 1979-1981. Munhall was also the corresponding editor of DU: Kulturelle Monatsschrift from 1980-1984.

During the thirty-five years that Munhall served as Curator at The Frick Collection, the institution produced the first multi-volume catalog of its holdings and began mounting special exhibitions on a regular basis. Munhall also contributed to a series of major acquisitions, including paintings by Gentile da Fabriano, Hans Memling, and François-Hubert Drouais. He was also instrumental in the acquisition of a significant collection of clocks and watches bequeathed to the museum in 1999 by Winthrop Kellogg Edey.

== Exhibitions ==
Munhall organized or contributed to twenty-eight exhibitions mounted at The Frick Collection and other institutions, including: "Jean-Baptiste Greuze, 1725-1805" (1976-1977), the first exhibition to focus on that artist; "Severo Calzetta called Severo da Ravenna" (1978); "Jean-Antoine Houdon: Eight Portrait Busts" (1981); "Ingres and the Comtesse d'Haussonville" (1985-1986); "François-Marius Granet: Watercolors from the Musée Granet at Aix-en-Provence" (1988); "Nicolas Lancret" (1991); "The Butterfly and the Bat: Whistler and Montesquiou" (1995-1996); "Sir John Soane: Collector and Connoisseur" (1996); and "Victorian Fairy Painting" (1998). After his official retirement in 1999, Munhall curated "Greuze the Draftsman" (2002) for The Frick Collection, the first show devoted to the artist's drawings. Munhall is recognized internationally as an authority on the art of Jean-Baptiste Greuze.

Munhall's drawings and sketchbooks were the subject of an exhibition held at the Frick Art Reference Library in the summer of 2002.

== Selected honors ==
Munhall was awarded a Distinguished Achievement Award of the Graduate Alumni Association of the Graduate School of Arts and Sciences at New York University in 1980. In 1989, he was named Chevalier, Ordre des Arts et des Lettres, by the French Minister of Culture for his significant contributions to the understanding and appreciation of French culture. He was named an Officier of the same order in 2001. He was also an Honorary Fellow of The Frick Collection and a Distinguished Scholar in Residence at the Frick Art Reference Library.

== Selected publications ==
- Jean-Baptiste Greuze, 1725-1805, 1976
- Ingres and the Comtesse d'Haussonville, 1985; reissued 1998 (received an American Museum Association Award of Merit and granted an Award of Honorable Mention in the Henry Allen Moe Prize for best exhibition catalogue published in New York State in that year)
- Whistler and Montesquiou: The Butterfly and the Bat, 1995 (awarded the Henry Allen Moe Prize for best exhibition catalogue published in New York State in that year)
- The Frick Collection: A Tour, 1999 (translated into French, German, Italian, Japanese and Spanish; awarded Honorable Mention in the American Museum Association competition for best museum publication of that year)
- Greuze the Draftsman, 2002

== Personal life ==
Munhall's partner of thirty-nine years was the film historian Richard Barsam.
