= Ange Laurent Lalive de Jully =

18th-century French financier and arts patron

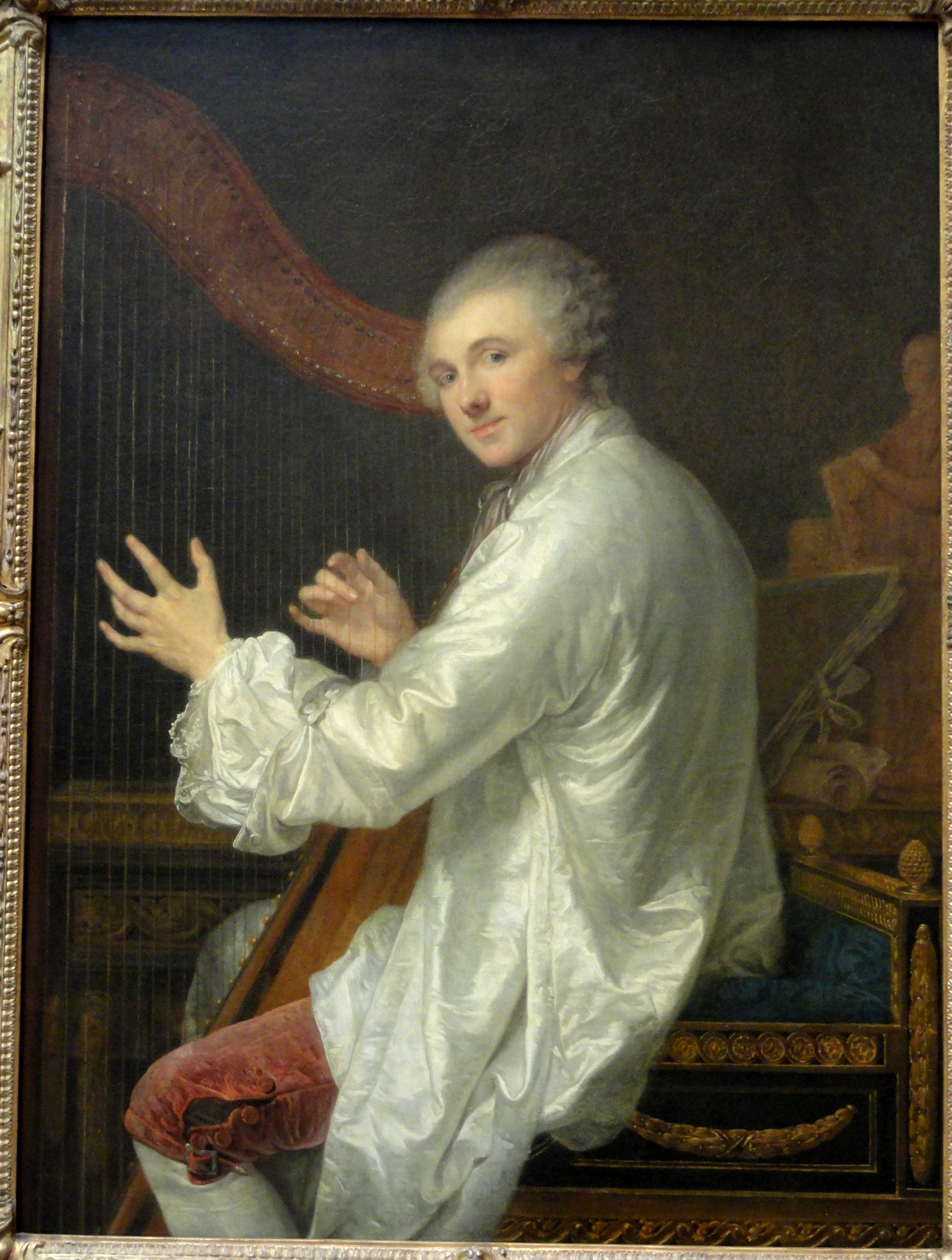
- Portrait by Jean Baptiste Greuze, 1759
- Born: 2 October 1725; Paris
- Died: 18 March 1779 (aged 64); Paris
- Occupation: Banker
- Spouses: Louise-Élisabeth Chambon; Nettine Walckiers

Ange-Laurent de La Live de Jully (2 October 1725 – 18 March 1779) was an 18th-century French financier and patron of arts.

On 30 June 1741, he married Louise-Elisabeth Chambon, reputed to be more than promiscuous. Madame d'Épinay tells us she pushed the absence of prejudice to the limit where it takes another name. She had a son, born on 7 June 1750. She died in December 1752, struck down by smallpox.

We know he led political missions in Geneva.

On 1 August 1762, he married his second wife, miss Nettine Walckiers, daughter of a Dutch banker and thus became Jean-Joseph de Laborde's brother-in-law, owner of the château de Méréville.

== Honours ==
- 27 April 1754 : Free Associate of the Académie de peinture
- 20 January 1756 : Announcer of ambassadors
- Chevalier, baron du Châtelet, marquis de Rémoville, seigneur du franc-alleu noble de Saint-Romain
