= Cupid Crowned by Psyche =

Painting by Jean-Baptiste Greuze

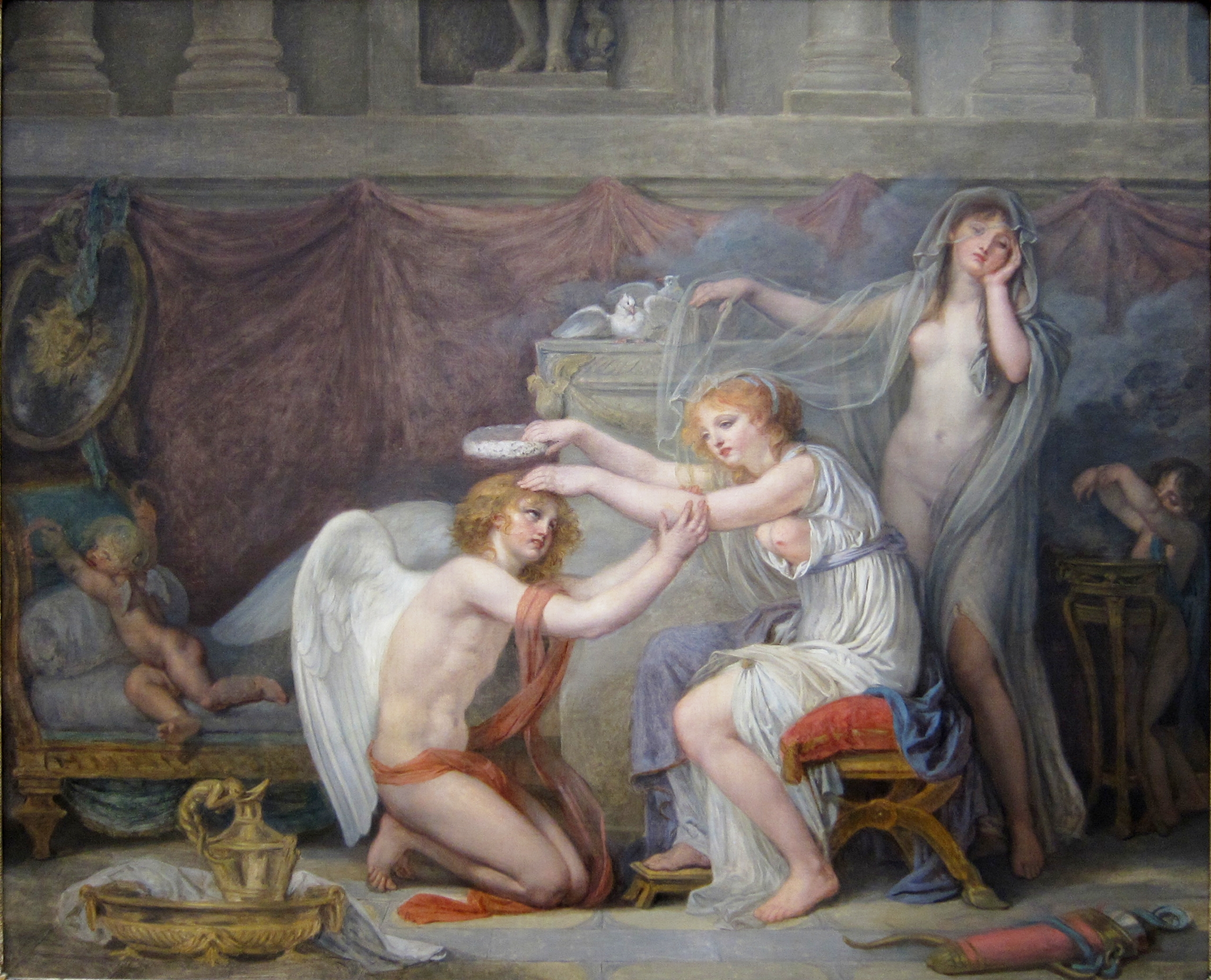
- Artist: Jean-Baptiste Greuze
- Year: 1785-1790
- Medium: Oil on canvas
- Dimensions: 147.5 cm × 179.7 cm (58.1 in × 70.7 in)
- Location: Palais des Beaux-Arts de Lille; Lille

Cupid Crowned by Psyche or Psyche Crowning Cupid is an oil-on-canvas painting executed ca. 1785–1790 by Jean-Baptiste Greuze, now in the Palais des Beaux-Arts de Lille. It shows a scene from the myth of Cupid and Psyche, with a figure of Modesty standing behind Psyche and two cupids in the background placing rose crowns on a bed and throwing incense on a tripod.

The work represents a return to the classical themes Greuze had abandoned after the poor reception for his The Emperor Severus Reproaching His Son Caracalla (1769). He began the work around the same time as he was commissioned to paint Innocence Led Captive by Love, another scene involving Cupid, by the comte d'Artois. However, Cupid Crowned remained incomplete, possibly due to the onset of the French Revolution, and was only exhibited publicly upon the death of the artist's daughter and heir Caroline Greuze in 1842. It was sold the following year and passed through several hands before reaching its present home in 1873 as part of a bequest by Alexandre Leleux.

== Description ==
The painting illustrates an episode from the myth of Psyche, a young mortal who attracted the jealousy of Aphrodite. She sends her son, Eros, god of love, to shoot her one of his arrows and the young girl falls in love with the ugliest of creatures. But it is Eros who falls under her spell and ends up marrying her. In the episode represented, Psyche is seated and is about to lay her white crown of purity on the forehead of a kneeling, androgynous looking Eros. Behind her, Modesty turns her face away while in the background a cupid places two wreaths of roses on a bed and another one throws incense into a burner.
