= The Father's Curse =

Painting by Jean-Baptiste Greuze

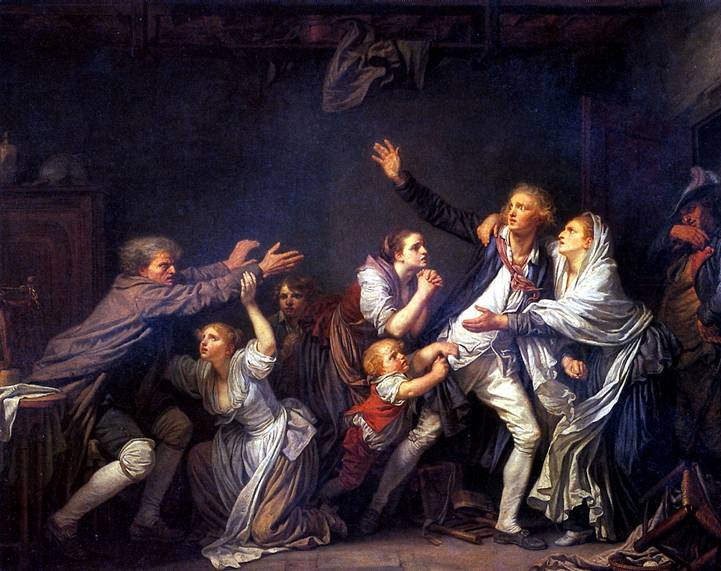
- Artist: Jean-Baptiste Greuze
- Year: 1777
- Medium: Oil on canvas
- Dimensions: 130 cm × 162 cm (51 in × 64 in)
- Location: Louvre; Paris

The Father's Curse is an oil-on-canvas painting by the French artist Jean-Baptiste Greuze, created in 1777. It is held in the Louvre, in Paris.

== History and description ==
It was first exhibited at the Paris Salon of 1777, where it was unanimously praised by art critics such as Denis Diderot. Based on Diderot's account of the 1761 Salon, the work depicts the dramatic scene of a son who is announcing to his family that he is leaving to join the army. His father is forbidding it and curses him as he leaves. The other members of the family present, three women and two children, presumably his mother and his four siblings, illustrate the ongoing drama. At the left, one of the women tries to stop the father of cursing the son, but seemingly in vain. The other characters seem to be trying to convince, with dramatic gestures and actions, the young son not to leave home. One of the women begs him with her hands joined, while one of the children grabs the youngster, in an futile attempt to stop him to leave. At the door, at the right, a soldier witnesses the dramatic scene, as he waits for the man to come with him. The work forms a pair with Greuze's The Son Punished.
