= Richard Barsam =

American film theorist

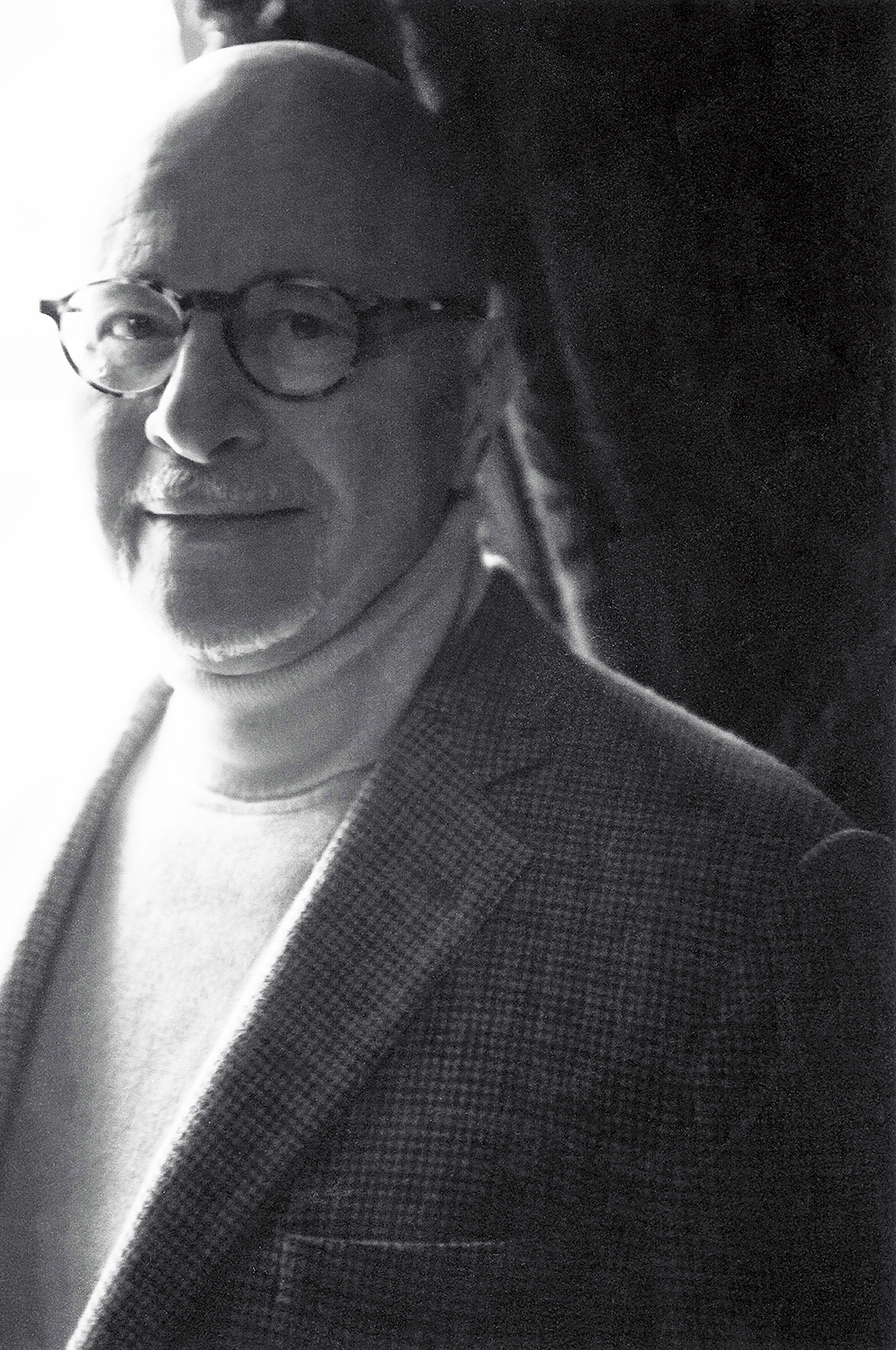
- Born: 1938 (age 87–88); Glendale, California, United States
- Education: University of Southern California
- Known for: Film historian, author

Richard Barsam (born 8 November 1938), author and film historian, is Professor Emeritus of Film Studies at Hunter College of The City University of New York (CUNY).

== Early life and education ==
Barsam was born in Glendale, California. He attended the University of Southern California, earning a PhD degree in English literature in 1967. Concurrently, he was encouraged by two film professors (Arthur Knight and Richard Dyer MacCann) to attend without credit film history and other courses in the USC School of Cinema (now the School of Cinematic Arts), an experience that was to influence his further academic career significantly.

== Career ==
In 1967, he joined the faculty of Richmond College, CUNY, where initially he taught courses both in English literature and film studies, eventually specializing exclusively in the latter.

Between 1984 and 1991, he held executive management positions at CUNY, including University Dean for Faculty and Research and University Dean for Executive Search and Evaluation. Between 1991 and 1992, he served as Provost of Pratt Institute.

In 1994, he resumed his teaching career as Professor of Film Studies at Hunter College, CUNY, and retired in 2001.

== Selected publications ==
- Nonfiction Film: A Critical History, 1973 (revised and expanded edition published in 1992)
- Filmguide to Triumph of the Will, 1975
- Nonfiction Film Theory and Criticism, 1976
- In the Dark: A Primer for the Movies, 1977
- The Vision of Robert Flaherty: The Artist as Myth and Filmmaker, 1988
- Nonfiction Film: A Critical History, 1973 (revised and expanded edition published in 1992)
- Looking at Movies: An Introduction to Film, 2003 (sixth edition published in 2019)

== Personal life ==
Barsam's partner of thirty-nine years was the art historian Edgar Munhall.
