= Ariadne (Greuze painting) =

Painting by Jean-Baptiste Greuze

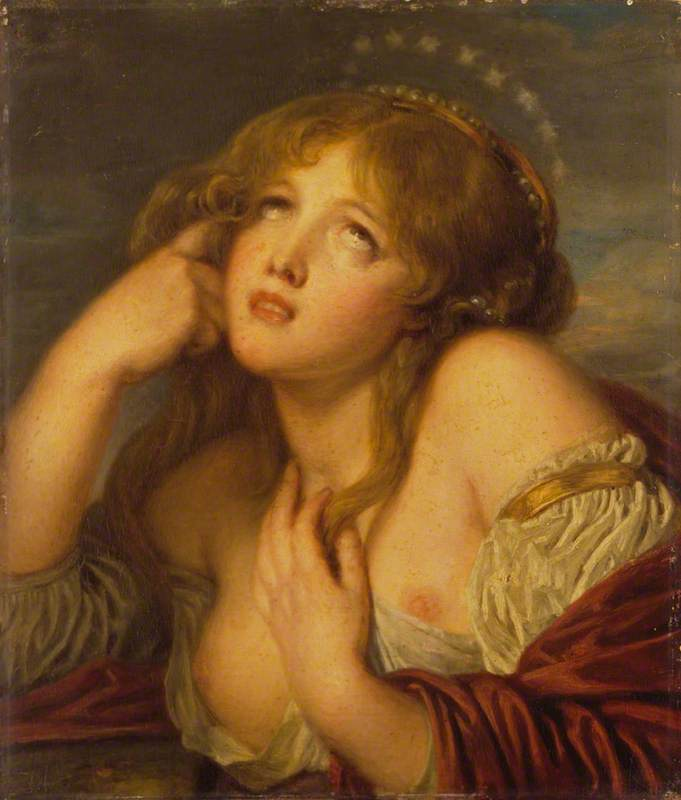
- Artist: Jean-Baptiste Greuze
- Year: c. 1804
- Type: Oil on panel
- Dimensions: 49 cm × 42.8 cm (19 in × 16.9 in)
- Location: Wallace Collection, London

Ariadne is an oil on panel painting by the French artist Jean-Baptiste Greuze, from c. 1804. It is held in the Wallace Collection, in London.

== History and description ==
It depicts Ariadne, a figure from Greek mythology, it features her wearing a Crown of Stars. According to Ovid, the Cretan princess Ariadne had helped Theseus defeat the Minotaur and escape the Labyrinth, only to be abandoned by him on the island of Naxos.

It is likely to be the Ariadne exhibited at the Salon of 1804 of Paris. Greuze had begun to submit work at the Salon of 1800 after more than thirty years absence following a dispute with the Académie Royale. Today it is the Wallace Collection, in London, having been acquired by the Marquess of Hertford in 1849.

As stated in the website of the Wallace Collection, Greuze paintings developed a genera of 'expressive heads' often erotically charged. In the story of Ariadne the 'expressive head', after she was saved by Bacchus he took her jeweled crown and threw it into the heavens making a constellation. "Ariadne in Greuze’s picture is characteristically shown lamenting her lost love before being comforted by the new. Her crown of stars may refer to the constellation named after her as well as to the divine nature of love."

== Bibliography ==
- Conisbee, Philip. French Genre Painting in the Eighteenth Century. National Gallery of Art, 2007.
- Hart, Clive & Stevenson, Kay Gilliland. Heaven and the Flesh: Imagery of Desire from the Renaissance to the Rococo. Cambridge University Press, 1995.
- Munhall, Edgar. Greuze the Draftsman. Merrell, 2002.
