= Charles Paul Jean Baptiste de Bourgevin Vialart de Saint-Morys =

French art collector (1743–1795)

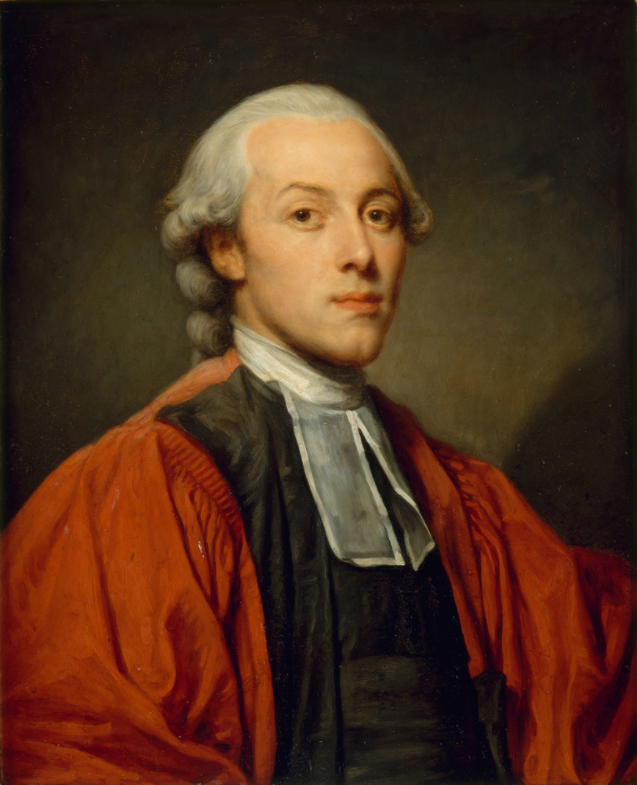
Portrait by Jean-Baptiste Greuze

Charles Paul Jean Baptiste de Bourgevin Vialart de Moligny, comte de Saint-Morys (11 July 1743, Paris – 15 August 1795, île de Houat) was a French art collector.

== Life ==
He was the son of Charles Paul Jean Baptiste de Bourgevin Vialart de Moligny (5 March 1713, Paris – June 1794, Paris), who was himself the son of Charles Antoine Jacques Bourgevin (1680–1764) and Catherine Thérèse Boucher. His mother was Charles Paul Jean Baptiste's wife, Marie Élisabeth Jean Baptiste Guyard de Saint-Clair (1721–1765), daughter of Jean Guyard de Saint-Clair and Marguerite Élisabeth Vialart. The Bourgevin family was linked to the Boucher, Grimaudet and Guiller families.

He was a member of the 1st (Grey) Company of the King's Musketeers from 1761 to 1769. He married Éléonore Élisabeth de Beauterne de Jauville on 29 July 1769, sole heiress to her uncle Étienne-Paul Boucher (1699–1778). Étienne-Paul was the son of the cloth merchant Louis-Paul Boucher and brother of Charles-Gabriel Boucher de l'Étang (commissioner for the 1st Company of the King's Musketeers) and Catherine Thérèse Boucher. His new wife's fortune allowed him to buy the office of counsellor in the Grand'chambre of the Parlement of Paris. He lived at 8 rue Vivienne in Paris an in 1780 bought an estate at Hondainville, where he began a manor house on the site of the old château to house his collection of drawings, paintings and natural history specimens. The building later became a prison before half the estate was bought by colonel Guillaume-Michel Barbier-Dufay (1769–1834), who demolished the house. The other half remained his wife's property.

He was an amateur draughtsman and engraver and in 1784 he also began potato farming in what is now the Canton of Mouy. He chose to leave France in 1790 at the start of the French Revolution and so his goods, lands and collections were seized, including all his drawings, which were integrated into the Louvre between 1796 and 1797. He and his wife divorced on 3 December 1794. He was made intendant general of the Catholic and Royal Army, but died on the Quiberon Expedition. His son Charles Étienne de Bourgevin Vialart de Saint-Morys was killed in a duel with colonel Barbier-Dufay on 21 July 1817.

== The Saint-Morys collection ==
He is most notable for his collection of drawings, which he began in 1769 and expanded using his wife's fortune and his inheritance from his uncle in 1778. Antoine Joseph Dezallier d'Argenville's collection of 3350 drawings were sold off on 18–28 January 1779 in 555 lots, of which 84 lots (around 424 drawings) were bought by Saint-Morys.

He also bought drawings at the sale of the marquis de Gouvernet's collection of 1013 drawings in 1775. At the Mariette sale (15 November 1775 – 30 January 1776) he bought 400 sheets. He was advised by Jacques Lenglier, who had qualified as an art dealer and painting dealer in 1786. Lenglier bought a third of the drawings at the Prince of Conti sale on 8 April 1777 on behalf of Saint-Morys. By the time he left France he had 12,644 drawings in his collection.

== Family ==
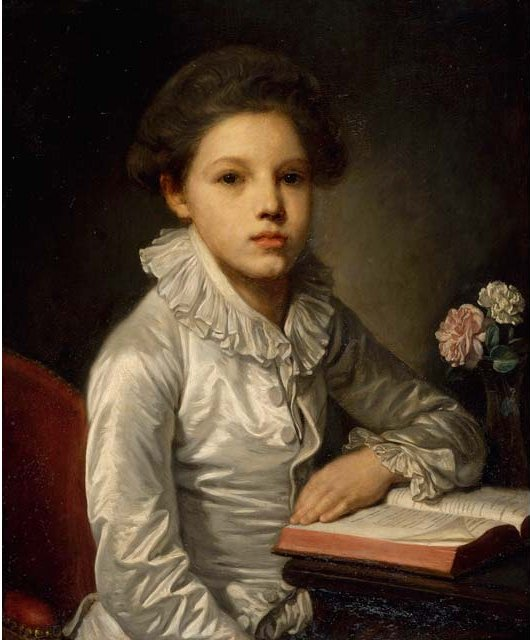
Portrait of Charles-Etienne de Bourgevin Vialart de Saint-Morys by Jean-Baptiste Greuze (Musée des beaux-arts de Nantes).

- Charles Antoine Jacques Bourgevin (1680–1764), married Catherine Thérèse Boucher
  - Charles Paul Jean Baptiste de Bourgevin Vialart de Moligny, in 1740 married Marie Élisabeth Jean Baptiste Guyard de Saint-Clair (1721–1765)
    - Charles Paul Jean Baptiste de Bourgevin Vialart de Saint-Morys, in 1769 married Éléonore Élisabeth de Beauterne de Jauville,
      - Charles Étienne de Bourgevin Vialart de Saint-Morys (17 January 1772 – 21 July 1817), in 1791 in Koblenz married Marie Anne Charlotte de Valicourt, daughter of Maximilien de Valicourt and Marie-Madeleine de Calonne, niece of minister Charles-Alexandre de Calonne.
        - Charlotte Marie Joséphine de Bourgevin Vialart de Saint-Morys, in 1816 married Jules de Gaudechart (1791–1817).

== Bibliography ==
- (in French) Françoise Arquié-Bruley, Jacqueline Labbé, Lise Bicart-Sée, La collection Saint-Morys au Cabinet des Dessins du Musée du Louvre, 2 volumes, Éditions de la Réunion des musées nationaux, Paris, 1987
- (in French) Samuel Gibiat, Hiérarchies sociales et ennoblissement. Les commissaires des guerres de la Maison du roi au XVIIIe siècle, École des chartes, Paris, 2006, p. 344-346 ISBN 2-900791-84-7 (sample)
- (in French) Louis-Pierre d'Hozier, Armorial général de la France, p. 155 (online)
