= Broken Eggs =

Painting by Jean-Baptiste Greuze

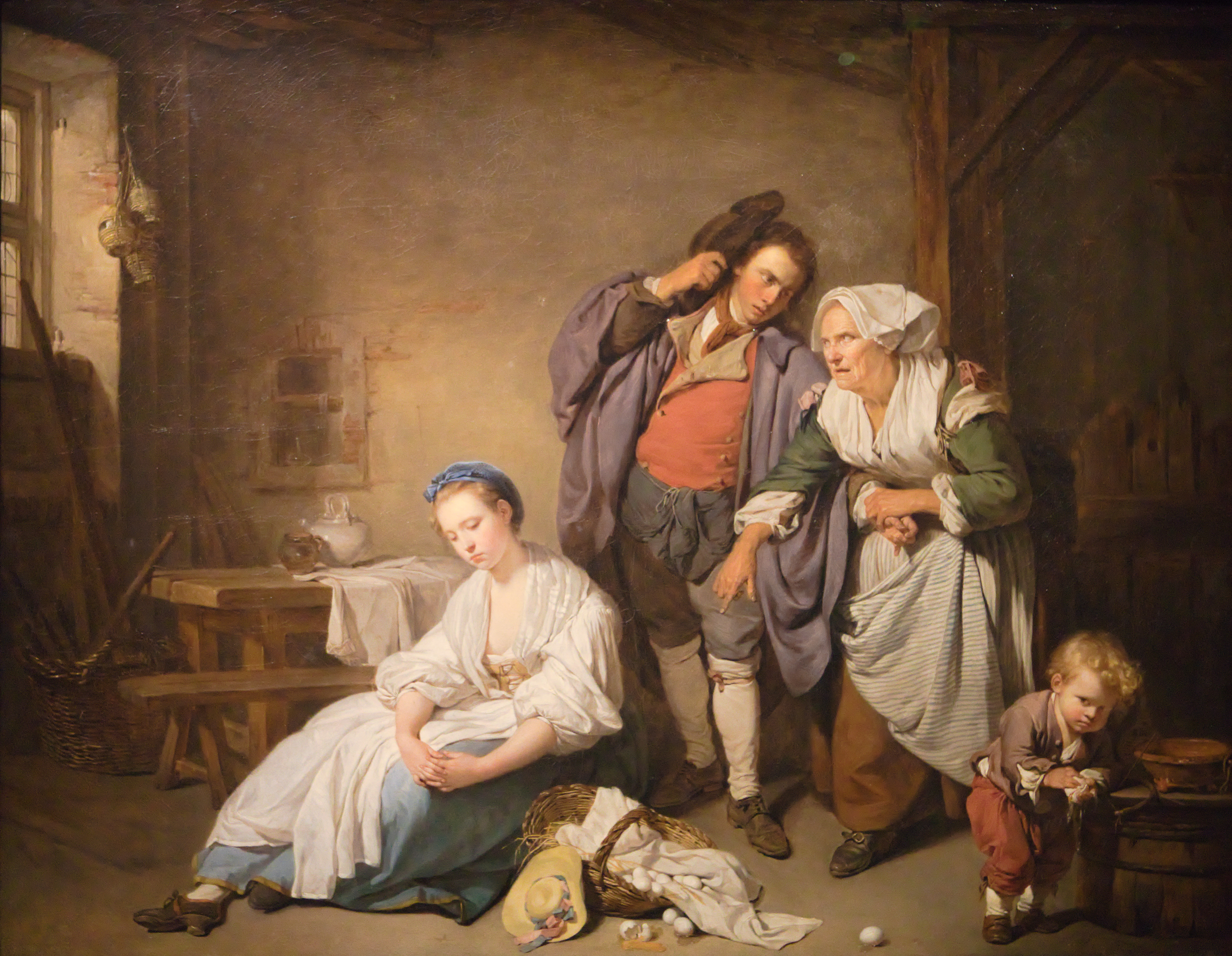
- Artist: Jean-Baptiste Greuze
- Year: 1756
- Medium: Oil on canvas
- Dimensions: 73 cm × 94 cm (29 in × 37 in)
- Location: Metropolitan Museum of Art; New York

Broken Eggs (French: Les Œufs cassés) is an oil on canvas painting by French artist Jean-Baptiste Greuze, created in 1756. It is held in the Metropolitan Museum of Art, in New York, which acquired it in 1920.

== History and description ==
Greuze exhibited the work in the Salon of 1757 at the Louvre with a long explanatory title: Une Mère grondant un jeune Homme pour avoir renversé un Panier d’Oeufs que sa Servante apportoit du Marché. Un Enfant tente de raccomoder un oeuf cassé ("A mother scolding a young man for having overturned a basket of eggs that her servant brought from the market. A child attempts to repair a broken egg").

The painting depicts an old woman rebuking a young man who is responsible for having broken the eggs in the basket of a servant girl who sits dejectedly on the floor. It is the first of many paintings by Greuze where he uses broken objects as a metaphor for the loss of a young girl's virginity.

After a two-year stay in Italy, the artist decided to return to France and show his works created in that country at the Paris Salon of 1757. At the exhibition, Greuze's works were side by side with works by Jean Siméon Chardin. There, Broken Eggs received high praise from critics. One of them wrote that the noble pose of the young maid “is worthy of the brush of a historical artist”.

The work was created in Rome, but the main source of inspiration may have been the painting of the same name by the Dutch painter Frans van Mieris the Elder (1655-1657), which Greuze may have known from an engraving. The artist, despite the main trends of Italian painting, was not really interested in subjects from ancient history and Roman mythology; instead he preferred modern subjects with moral overtones.

Greuze created genre paintings depicting scenes from everyday life. In the spring of 1756, he created Broken Eggs for Abbé Gougenot. He also made another painting for him in February 1757, The Neapolitan Gesture. Both works are of similar size and presumably had a narrative connection. In Broken Eggs, a mother appears to be scolding her young son for knocking over a basket of eggs that a maid has brought from the market, while a small child tries to mend a broken egg. Greuze often depicted in his works three or more characters, varying in age, who are involved in some kind of conflict, while occasionally one of them is providing commentary on the actions of the others; in this case that is the child. It seems clear from the looks of the saddened maid and the gloomy child that something more than eggs has been lost. For an 18th-century viewer, it would be clear that broken eggs were a symbol of the loss of innocence. The child's gaze towards the other characters and the shell of a broken egg in his hand, the content of which flows down to the ground, prompts the viewer to wonder about the connection between the maid and the young man.
