= L'Indifférent =

Painting by Antoine Watteau

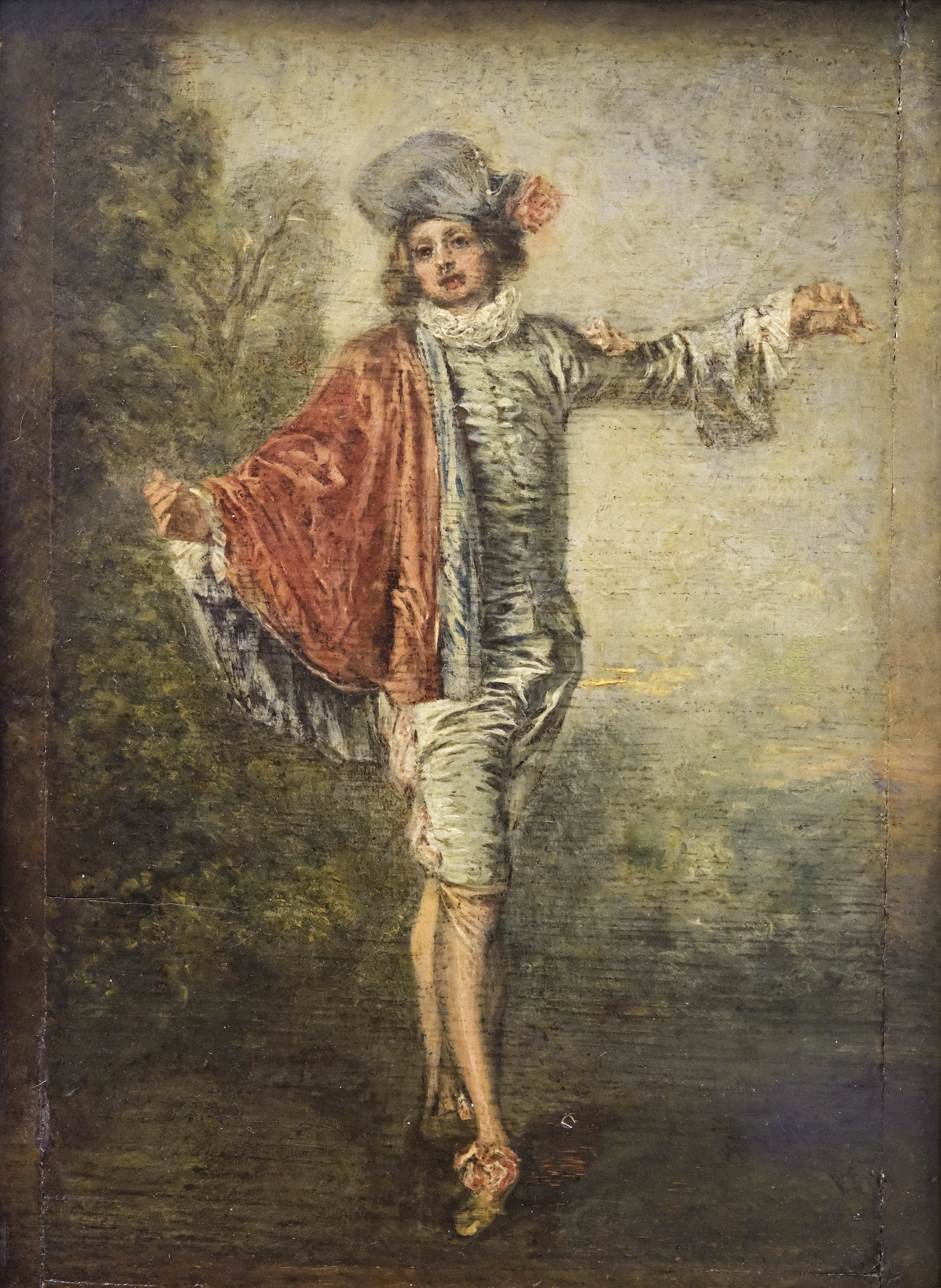
L'Indifférent (1717) by Antoine Watteau

L'Indifférent is a 1717 oil on panel painting by Antoine Watteau, which entered the Louvre in the collection of Louis La Caze in 1869.
