= The Kitchen Maid (disambiguation) =

The Kitchen Maid is a 1620–1622 painting by Diego Rodríguez de Silva y Velázquez.

The Kitchen Maid may also refer to:

- The Kitchen Maid (Chardin), a 1738 painting by Jean Simeon Chardin
- The Kitchen Maid (Rembrandt), a 1651 painting by Rembrandt

== See also ==
- Kitchen maid (disambiguation)
