= Saying grace =

Saying grace may refer to:

- Grace (prayer), commonly called saying grace, a short prayer said at meals

== Paintings ==
- Saying Grace (Chardin), several 1740s paintings by Jean Simeon Chardin
- Saying Grace (Rockwell), 1951 painting by American illustrator Norman Rockwell
- Saying Grace (van Gogh), part of Van Gogh's Peasant Character studies
