= The Buffet (Chardin) =

Painting by Jean Siméon Chardin

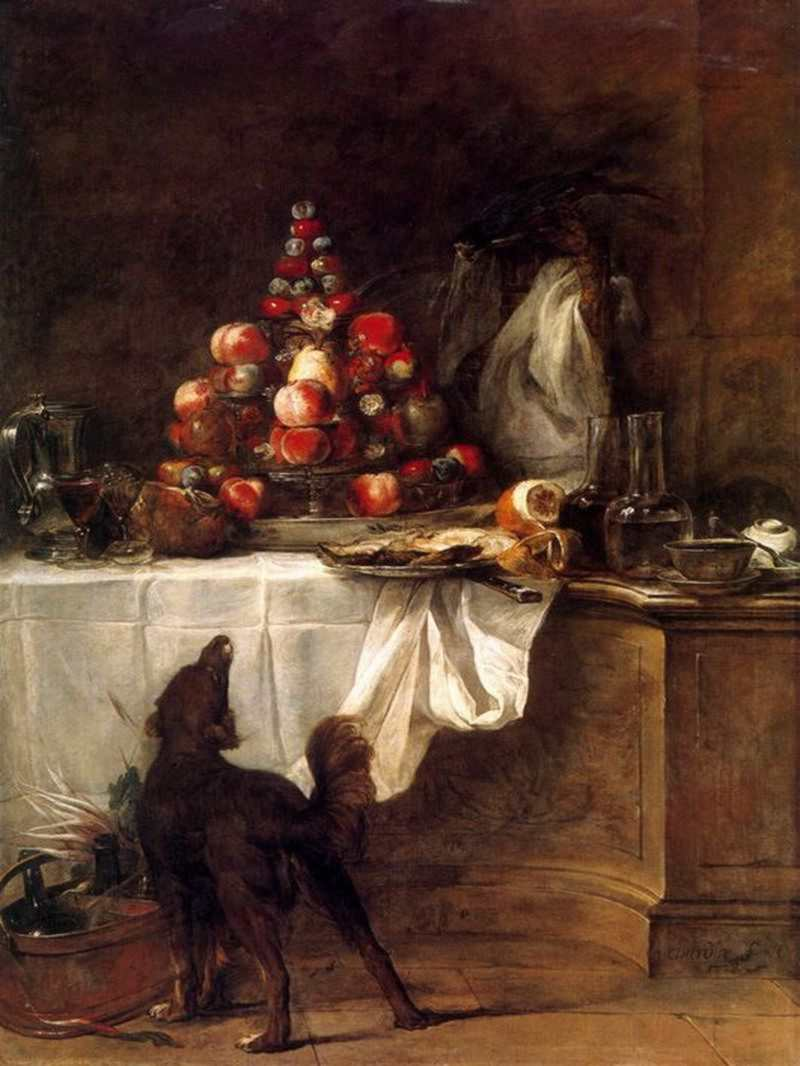
The Buffet (1728)

The Buffet is an oil-on-canvas still life painting executed in 1728 by Jean Siméon Chardin. It and The Ray were Chardin's reception pieces to the Académie royale de peinture et de sculpture; both are now in the Louvre.
