= Louis La Caze =

French physician and collector of paintings

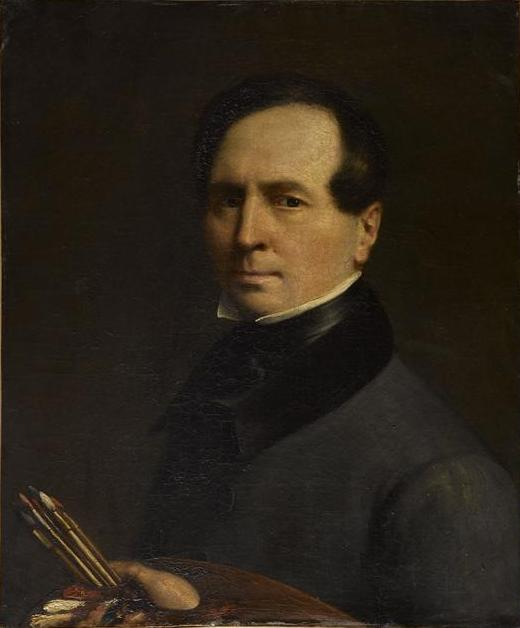
Louis La Caze, self-portrait, c. 1843.

Louis La Caze (6 May 1798 – 28 September 1869) was a successful French medical doctor and collector of paintings whose bequest of 583 paintings to the Musée du Louvre was one of the largest the museum has ever received. Among the paintings, the most famous are likely to be Pierrot (also known as Gilles) by Antoine Watteau, or Rembrandt's Bathsheba at Her Bath.

Born to a family of social standing, he retreated to simple rooms in the Latin Quarter of Paris. A dedicated student devoted to the theory of medicine, he demonstrated during the cholera epidemic of 1831-32 that cholera was not directly transmissible, by sharing the quarters of a dying patient. He was afterwards presented with a medal of honor. As he found himself in no want of fortune, he drew his practice from among the poor, pro bono, and lived a life of extreme simplicity and privacy. In 1852 he retired altogether from hospital work, discouraged at the lack of progress being made against tuberculosis and typhoid fever among the working class. In addition to his bequest to the Louvre, he left funds for the study of these two endemic diseases.

The bequest to the Louvre did not come as a surprise. For decades La Caze, who was an amateur painter himself, had haunted minor dealers in second-hand bric-a-brac, paying modest prices for paintings that were not in the mainstream of fashion and were not easily nursed through the cumbersome vetting process that led to official purchases for the Louvre. His taste was for realists and for domestic subjects that were not among the theatrical conventions of official classicism that was in vogue. As the rest of the art world caught up, La Caze was to be seen haunting the Paris auction houses. La Caze's salon in the rue du Cherche-Midi was open to progressive artists such as Degas and Manet or François Bonvin, who were training their manner on close examination of painters like Velázquez, whose Portrait of the Infanta Marie-Therese (1653) was in La Caze's collection, and Jusepe de Ribera, at a time when the Spanish school of painting was largely ignored in French official circles. La Caze, who had four of Fragonard's fancy pieces, his Portraits de fantaisie, also had an eye for the still largely unappreciated work of Jean-Baptiste-Siméon Chardin: Chardin's Le Bénédicité, found in a quai-side flea market, was among the first purchases that hung on the doctor's walls, and Chardin's simple choices in still life and his sober colour, animated La Caze's own efforts at painting.

Some 250 of La Caze's paintings were retained at the Louvre, while the rest were distributed among the provincial museums of France.
