= The Kitchen Maid (Chardin) =

Painting by Jean Simeon Chardin

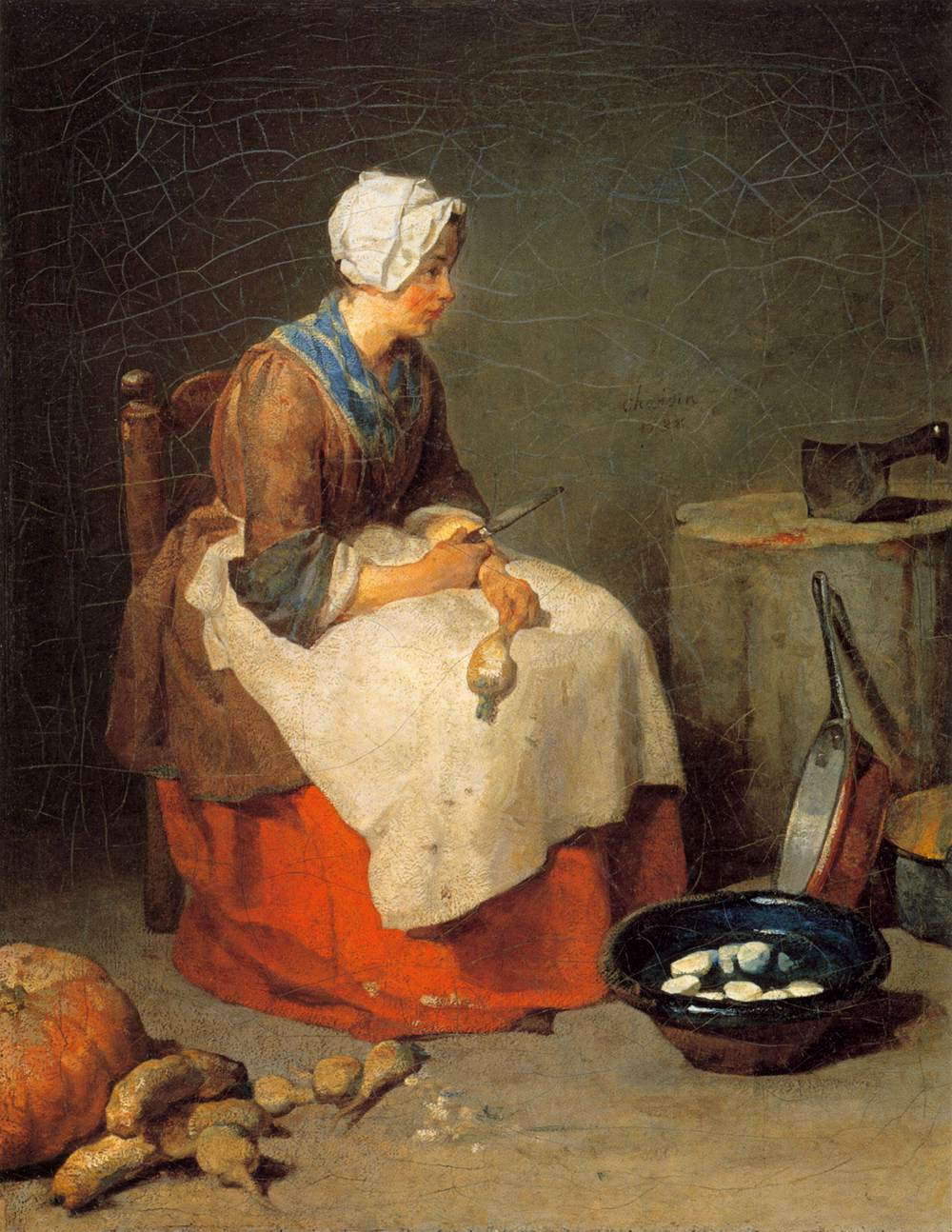
- Artist: Jean-Baptiste-Siméon Chardin
- Year: 1738
- Type: Oil on canvas
- Dimensions: 46.2 cm × 37.5 cm (18.2 in × 14.8 in)
- Location: National Gallery of Art, Washington, D.C.
- Accession: 1952.5.38

The Kitchen Maid is a 1738 oil-on-canvas painting by Jean Simeon Chardin. The painting features a young kitchen maid in a Hollandish kitchen, taking a break from her work. The work was popular, and Chardin had made four different copies; with three of them present in various collections in the modern day.

== Background ==
Chardin was born in Paris, the son of a cabinetmaker, and rarely left the city. Chardin entered into a marriage contract with Marguerite Saintard in 1723, whom he did not marry until 1731. According to one nineteenth-century writer, at a time when it was hard for unknown painters to come to the attention of the Royal Academy, he first found notice by displaying a painting at the "small Corpus Christi" on the Place Dauphine. Van Loo, passing by in 1720, bought it and later assisted the young painter.

Upon presentation of The Ray in 1728, he was admitted to the Académie Royale de Peinture et de Sculpture. The following year he ceded his position in the Académie de Saint-Luc. He made a modest living by "produc[ing] paintings in the various genres at whatever price his customers chose to pay him", and by such work as the restoration of the frescoes at the Galerie François I at Fontainebleau in 1731. In November 1731 his son Jean-Pierre was baptized, and a daughter, Marguerite-Agnès, was baptized in 1733. In 1735 his wife Marguerite died, and within two years Marguerite-Agnès had died as well.

== Subject and composition ==
Chardin's pigments are granular, his palette earthy, and his handling is thick. The light of the painting has been described as subdued, with nothing being sudden or jarring. There is a superficial reference to Hollandish kitchens, and this is done only with respect to the props and predominantly brown coloring. The primary object of the painting is a young kitchen maid on a low chair, looking to the right of the viewer during what appears to be a pause from her task. The expression on the maid's face is one that is neither of sadness nor one of joy; picturing a woman that is focused on her work. The pictorial space is bounded, with a quality of contentment and timelessness. On the floor are assorted vegetables, some cooking pots, and a butcher's block. The block features a meat-cleaver with a spat of blood, bringing in the suggestion of violence to the purposed domestic reflection.

It is unknown whether Chardin had intended for there to be a message in the painting, or in any of his paintings. Despite portraying a servant helping in domestic tasks—described to be of a low social scale—the woman was still dressed well. In addition, the kitchen is kept in neat order; a sharp contrast to the portrayals of domestic servants in other paintings of the time. Nevertheless, the maid is still not a model of industry either, as the viewer in intended to speculate on what the maid is speculating in her moment of pause. It has been mentioned by critics that there is a sensuous quality in Chardin's execution, in design, and in the choice of his colors. The techniques of ambiguity and sense has been noted to be a common trait for many of Chardin's works.

== Exhibition ==
Chardin first exhibited the painting along with five other works at the Salon of 1739 as La Ratisseuse de Navets (Woman scraping Turnips). When the painting was first submitted, it drew little attention from critics due to the success of his other painting: The Governess. Chardin painted at least three versions of the painting. The existing works are the Washington copy, signed and dated to 1738; another in Munich, signed and dated to 1746; a copy given by Count Rudolf von Rothenburg for Frederick II of Prussia, lost since 1918; and the fourth copy in the Netherlands, believed to be a studio copy. The existence of four copies of the painting attests to the success of the painting with some copies, such as the Washington copy, being at some point acquired by royals such as the Prince of Liechtenstein.
