= Kitchen maid =

Kitchen maid may refer to:

- Kitchen maid (domestic worker), a domestic worker
- Kitchen maid (pulley airer), a laundry airer

== See also ==
- The Kitchen Maid (disambiguation)
