= The House of Cards =

Painting by Jean Siméon Chardin

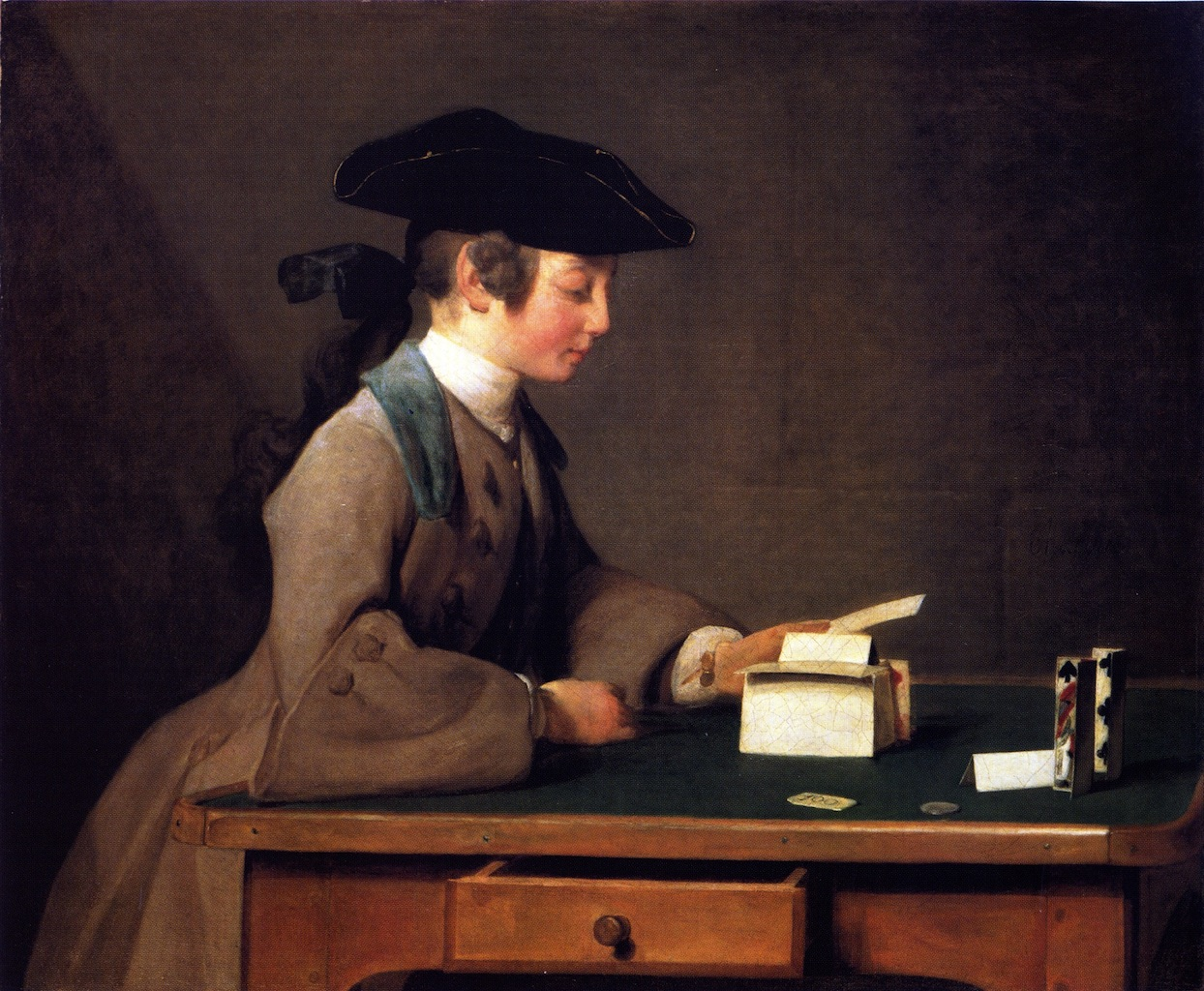
- Artist: Jean Siméon Chardin
- Year: c. 1740-1741
- Medium: oil on canvas
- Dimensions: 60 cm × 72 cm (24 in × 28 in)
- Location: National Gallery, London

The House of Cards is an oil painting by Jean Siméon Chardin. It was painted c. 1740 – c. 1741. It measures 60 cm × 72 cm (23.5 in × 28.5 in). It hangs in the National Gallery, in London. There are three other versions of the same motif at the National Gallery of Art, in Washington D.C., the Uffizi, in Florence and at Waddesdon Manor, in England. Chardin painted scenes that found favor with all classes of Parisian society.

== Description ==
The painting shows a young boy standing at a small wooden table, who is building carefully a house of playing cards. The table has a drawer open and a green table cover. The boy was named Jean-Alexandre Le Noir, and he was the son of furniture dealer and cabinetmaker, Jean-Jacques Le Noir. The theme of children building houses of cards was usual at the time.

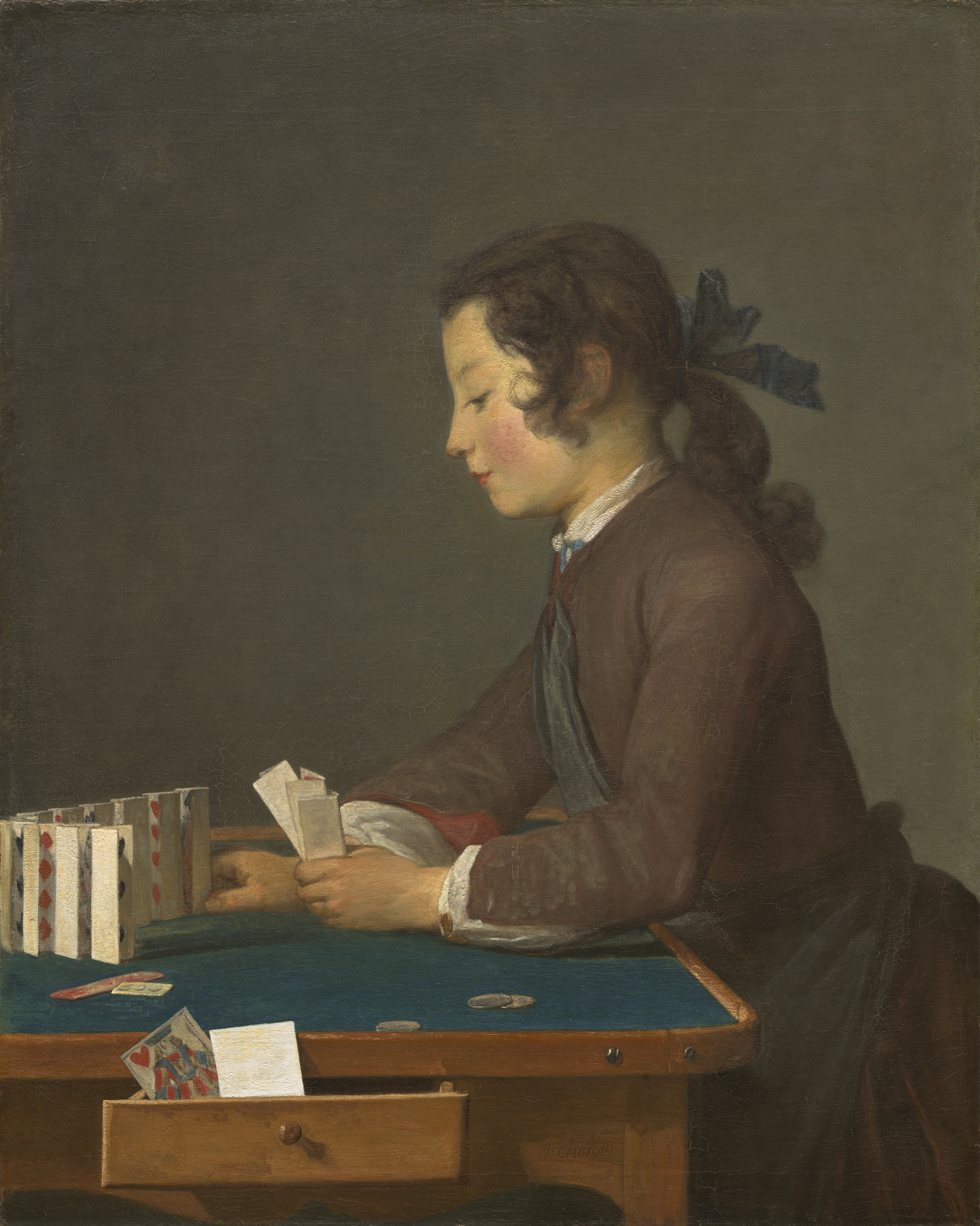
Jean Siméon Chardin, The House of Cards (c. 1737), National Gallery of Art, other painting of the same title
