= Soap Bubbles (Chardin) =

Painting by Jean Siméon Chardin

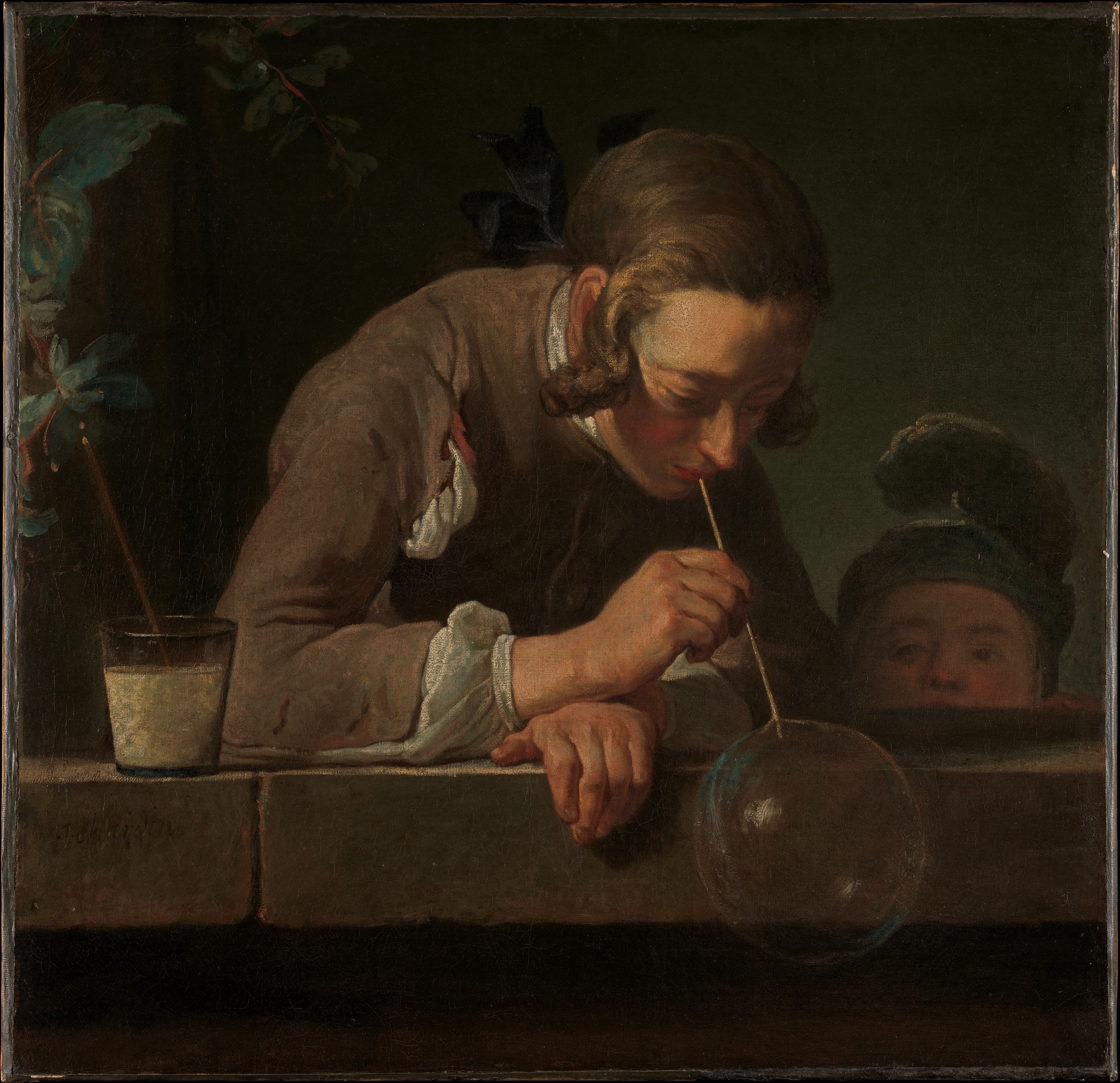
- The version of Soap Bubbles in the collection of the Metropolitan Museum of art. Chardin painted at least three versions of Soap Bubbles, the oldest known version of which is in the Met.
- Artist: Jean-Baptiste-Siméon Chardin
- Year: c. 1733–34
- Medium: Oil on canvas
- Dimensions: 61 cm × 63.2 cm (24 in × 24.9 in)
- Location: Metropolitan Museum of Art; New York City
- Accession: 49.24

Soap Bubbles refers to a series of early 18th-century paintings by French artist Jean-Baptiste-Siméon Chardin. Done in oil on canvas, Bubbles - Chardin's first figural painting - depicts a young man blowing a soap bubble. Chardin's original work is currently in the collection of the Metropolitan Museum of Art, and two later versions of the painting are in the collections of the Los Angeles County Museum and the National Gallery of Art.

== Description ==
Though he had been trained as an academic artist, Chardin often shirked away from academic art. Notably, he resisted painting figures using models, instead choosing to paint from memory or conceptually during the early stages of his career. His first painting in which he used a model to paint a picture was Soap Bubbles, thus making said painting his first figural painting. Chardin exhibited his work at the 1739 Paris Salon, though which version of Soap Bubbles he presented is not known.

Some sources speculate that Chardin chose soap bubbles as a subject due to their historical appearance in 17th-century Dutch paintings where they served as allusions to the transience of life.
