= Saying Grace (Chardin) =

Painting by Jean Siméon Chardin

Saying Grace (Le Bénédicité)
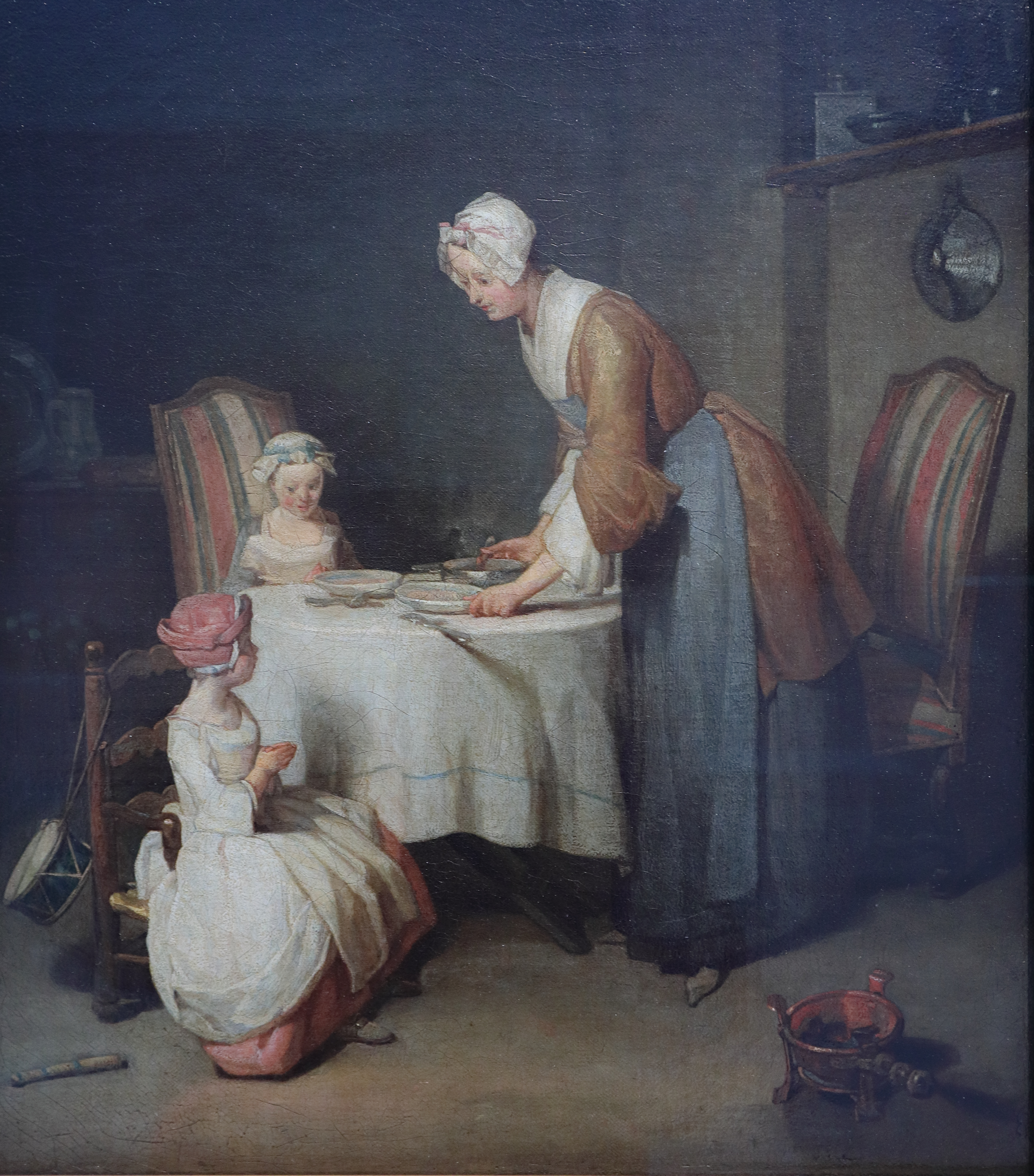
- Artist: Jean-Baptiste-Siméon Chardin
- Year: c. 1740
- Medium: Oil on canvas
- Dimensions: 49.5 cm × 38.5 cm (19.5 in × 15.2 in)
- Location: Louvre, Paris

Saying Grace or The Prayer Before a Meal (French: Le Bénédicité) is the title of several paintings by French artist Jean Simeon Chardin, one of which was given as a gift to Louis XV. The subject of the painting, a middle-class French family saying grace before a meal, is one of everyday bourgeois tranquillity – Chardin's area of interest – with an uncharacteristic touch of sentimentality.

== History ==
Chardin, who had made his fame painting still life, had at this point in his career started also to include human figures in his works. He painted several versions of Le Bénédicité, three of which were exhibited at the Salon, in 1740, 1746 and 1761. The original, from 1740, was given as a gift to the King. The painting fell into oblivion ten years after the death of Louis XV, but was rediscovered in 1845. Another version was kept by the artist throughout his life, and eventually ended up in the Musée du Louvre, through the large bequest of Louis La Caze in 1869. The version from the 1761 Salon – a horizontal composition – is now lost.

== The painting ==
Chardin is well known for his depictions of humble, everyday life. Le Bénédicité shows a modest, middle-class interior scene, where a mother is laying the table for a meal. She instructs her children to say their grace before eating. The younger of the children can easily appear a girl to the modern eye, if the drum hanging on the child-sized ladderback chair is overlooked, and is indeed identified as such in Gardner. Rand and Bianco, however, quote the inscription on a contemporary engraving, describing the child as a boy, who has not yet been breeched. The quiet, peaceful atmosphere is reinforced by the subdued colour scheme, and the muted lighting. Chardin put much work into the arrangement of the various elements of his paintings. The composition here is meticulous, and the stability created by the triangular structure of the three figures also adds to the tranquillity of the scene.

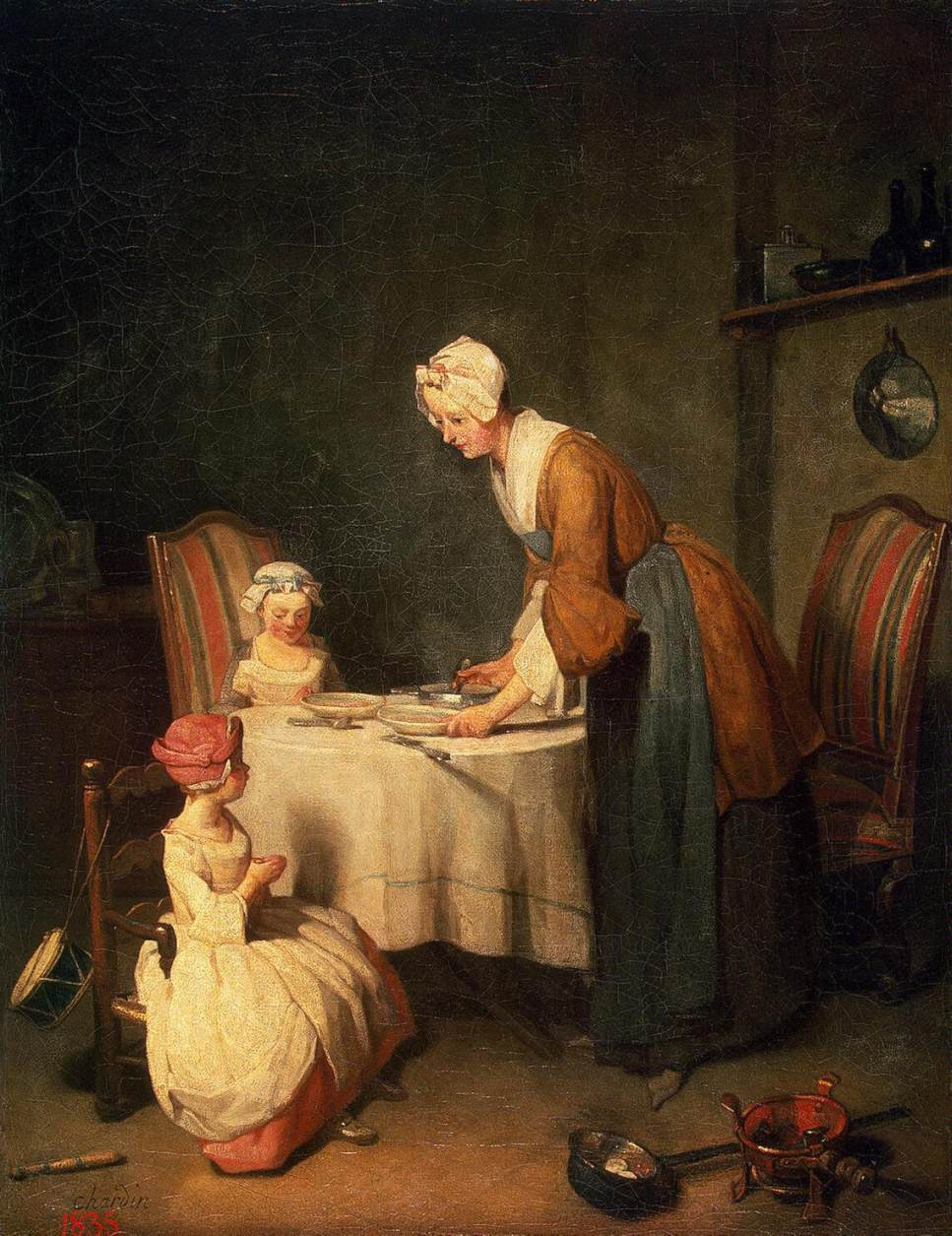
Hermitage version

=== Variants ===
The Louvre holds a variant exhibited at the 1740 Paris Salon. There are other variants in the Museum Boijmans Van Beuningen in Rotterdam (with a small boy added on the left) and the Nationalmuseum in Stockholm.

=== Hermitage version ===
A version in the Hermitage Museum dated 1744 was for many years thought to be the only signed and dated version of this painting. It is signed in the bottom left hand corner. Chardin was presented to Louis XV at the Palace of Versailles on 27 November 1740 by Philibert Orry, the king's superintendent of buildings and controller general of finances – Chardin's only meeting with the monarch. This was one of two paintings the artist presented to Louis on that occasion; the Mercure de France reported that the king "received [the paintings] very favourably; these two little works are already well known, having been exhibited at the Salon in the Louvre last August. We mentioned them in the October Mercure, under the title The Laborious Mother and Saying Grace." The work entered the Hermitage Museum between 1763 and 1774 under Catherine II of Russia.

=== Wemyss version ===
In 2014, a version of the painting in the collection of Lady Wemyss was attributed to the school of Chardin and sold for £1.15M. A subsequent examination revealed Chardin's signature, leading to its reattribution to Chardin. It was resold for $10.5m (£8.5m) in January 2015.

== Reception ==
Chardin is often contrasted to Watteau, whose paintings of aristocratic life differ greatly from those of Chardin's common people. It is not known for certain whether Le Bénédicité was painted with Louis XV in mind, or if it was the king who personally picked the painting out from the 1740 exhibition. In either case, the purchase shows the appeal the painting had to its contemporaries. When it was rediscovered in 1845 – on the eve of the revolutions of 1848 – it had taken on a whole new meaning. To the bourgeois establishment, the works of Chardin now represented a salutary contrast to the 'decadent aristocratic flimsy' of Watteau. In 1848, an anonymous reviewer in the journal Magasin Pittoresque wrote:

Watteau did lunches on the grass, walks in the moonlight, the capricious beauty of the day with her elegant lover of choice, dances under the trees with titled shepherds and shepherdesses; but Chardin did the honest and peaceful interior, the mother who clothes her son before sending him to school, the mother teaching her offspring to stutter the name of God...It would seem that one century could not contain two stories so different, yet they coincided.

— vol. XVI, 1848

== Sources ==
- Gardner, Helen (1991), Gardner's Art Through the Ages (9th ed.), San Diego: Harcourt Brace Jovanovich, ISBN 0-15-503769-2
- Gombrich, E. H. (1995), The Story of Art (16th ed.), London and New York, ISBN 0-7148-3355-X
- Hyland, Paul, ed. (2003), The Enlightenment: A Sourcebook and Reader, London: Routledge, ISBN 0-415-20448-8
- Rand, Richard; Bianco, Juliette M. (1997), Intimate Encounters: Love and Domesticity in Eighteenth-Century France, Princeton, N.J.: Princeton University Press, ISBN 0-691-01662-3
- Rosenberg, Pierre (2000), Chardin, Munich and London: Prestel, ISBN 3-7913-2339-3

== Bibliography ==
- Nemilova, I. (1961), Chardin et ses tableaux à l'Ermitage (in Russian), Leningrad
- Rosenberg, Pierre (1983), Tout l'œuvre peint de Chardin (in French), Paris: Flammarion
- Wildenstein, Georges (1921), Chardin (in French), Paris, no. 78
