= Jean Siméon Chardin =

French painter (1699–1779)

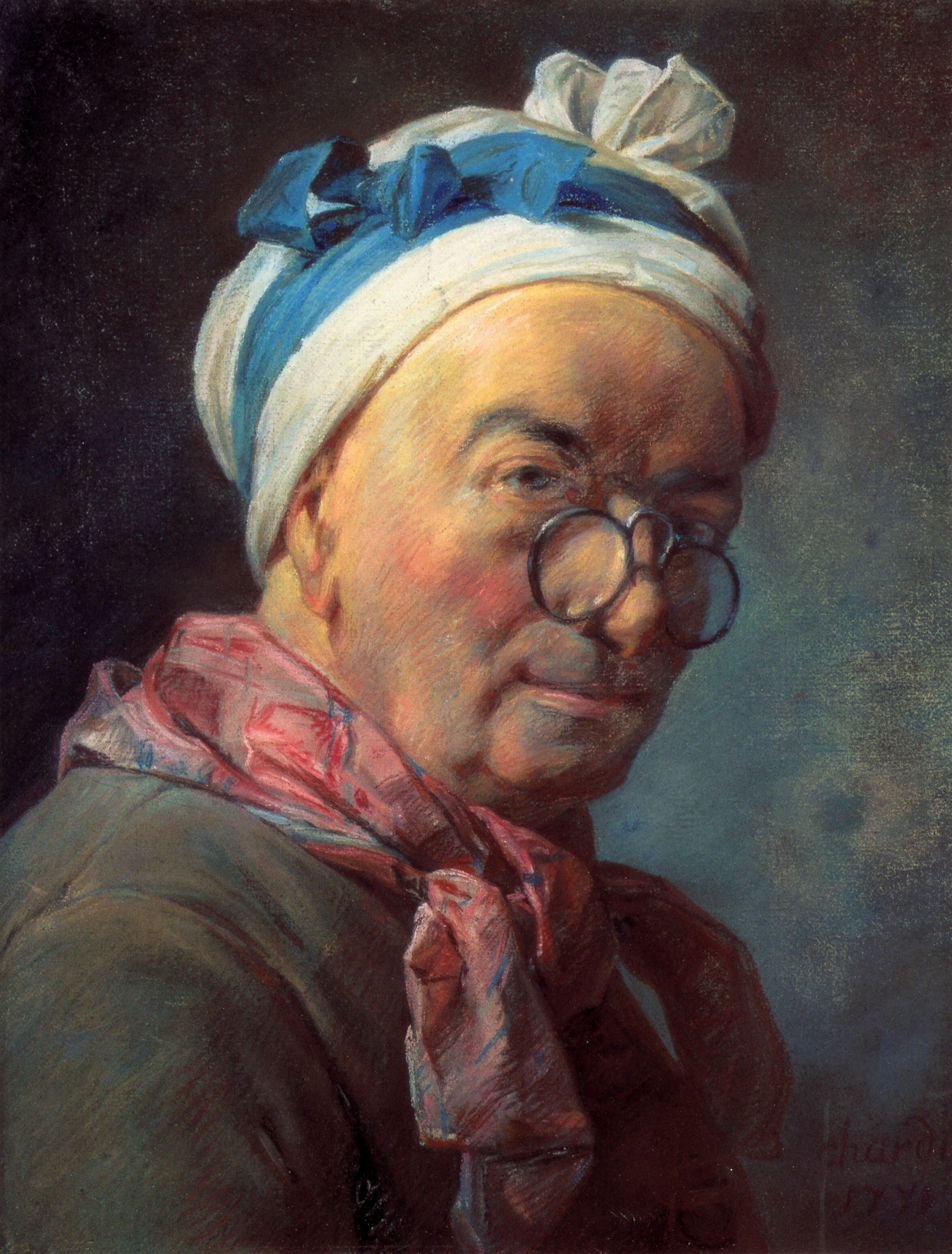
- Self-portrait, 1771, pastel, Louvre
- Born: 2 November 1699; Rue de Seine, Paris, France
- Died: 6 December 1779 (aged 80); Louvre, Paris, France
- Resting place: Saint-Germain l'Auxerrois
- Education: Pierre-Jacques Cazes, Noël-Nicolas Coypel, Académie de Saint-Luc
- Known for: Painting: still life and genre
- Notable work: The Ray, Soap Bubbles, Saying Grace
- Movement: Baroque, Rococo
- Patrons: Louis XV

Jean Siméon Chardin (French: [ʒɑ̃ simeɔ̃ ʃaʁdɛ̃]; November 2, 1699 – December 6, 1779) was an 18th-century French painter. He is considered a master of still life, and is also noted for his genre paintings which depict kitchen maids, children, and domestic activities. Carefully balanced composition, soft diffusion of light, and granular impasto characterize his work.

== Life ==
Chardin was born in Paris, the son of a cabinetmaker, and rarely left the city. He lived on the Left Bank near Saint-Sulpice until 1757, when Louis XV granted him a studio and living quarters in the Louvre Palace.

Chardin entered into a marriage contract with Marguerite Saintard in 1723, whom he did not marry until 1731. He served apprenticeships with the history painters Pierre-Jacques Cazes and Noël-Nicolas Coypel, and in 1724 became a master in the Académie de Saint-Luc.

According to one nineteenth-century writer, at a time when it was hard for unknown painters to come to the attention of the Royal Academy, he first found notice by displaying a painting at the "small Corpus Christi" (held eight days after the regular one) on the Place Dauphine (by the Pont Neuf). Van Loo, passing by in 1720, bought it and later assisted the young painter.

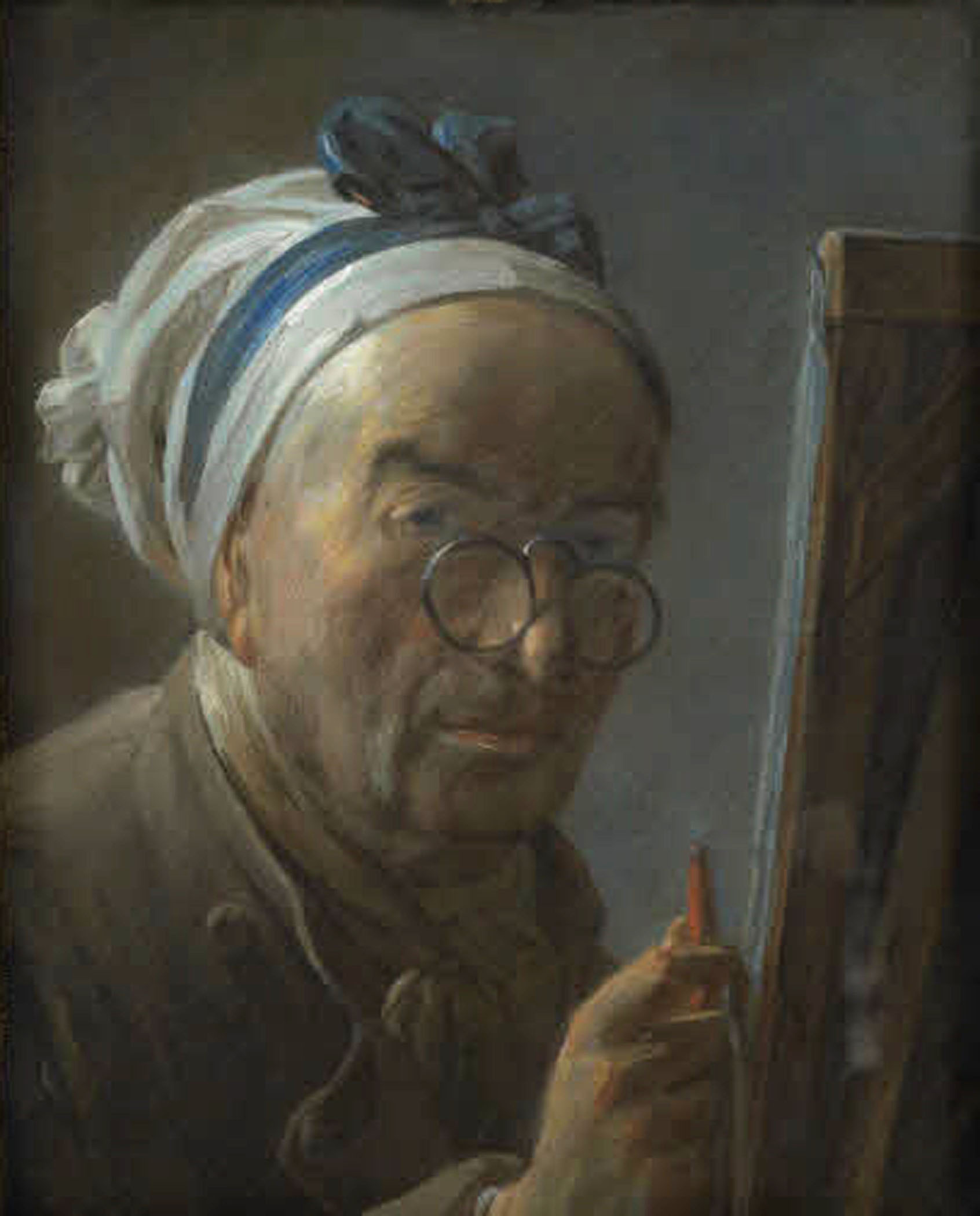
Self Portrait at an Easel (ca. 1779), pastel, 40.5 x 32.5 cm., Louvre

Upon presentation of The Ray and The Buffet in 1728, he was admitted to the Académie Royale de Peinture et de Sculpture. The following year he ceded his position in the Académie de Saint-Luc. He made a modest living by "produc[ing] paintings in the various genres at whatever price his customers chose to pay him", and by such work as the restoration of the frescoes at the Galerie François I at Fontainebleau in 1731. In November 1731 his son Jean-Pierre was baptized, and a daughter, Marguerite-Agnès, was baptized in 1733. In 1735 his wife Marguerite died, and within two years Marguerite-Agnès had died as well.

Beginning in 1737 Chardin exhibited regularly at the Salon. He would prove to be a "dedicated academician", regularly attending meetings for fifty years, and functioning successively as counsellor, treasurer, and secretary, overseeing in 1761 the installation of Salon exhibitions.

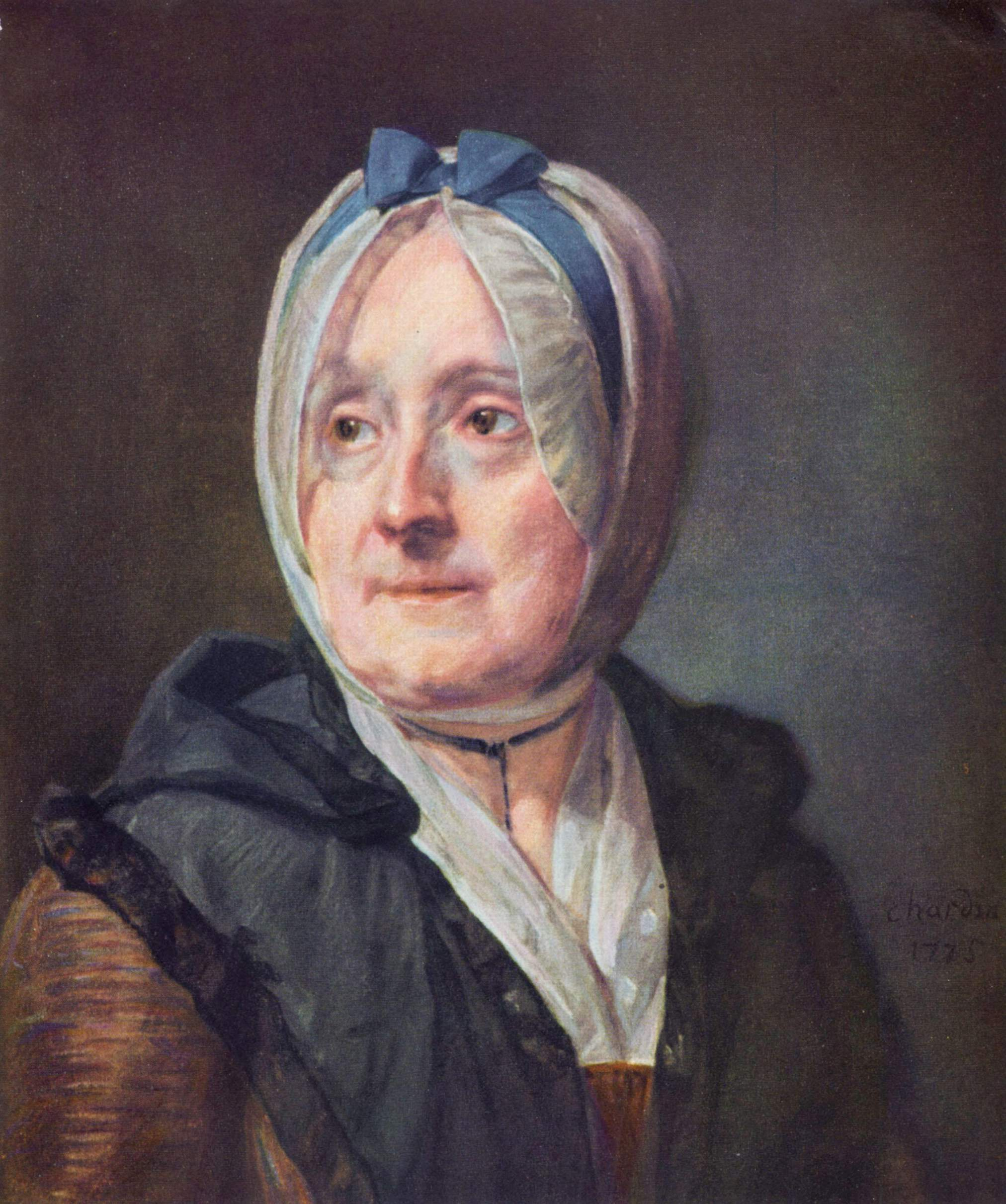
Françoise-Marguerite Pouget (1707–1791), 2nd wife of Chardin (1775), pastel, 46 x 38 cm., Louvre

Chardin's work gained popularity through reproductive engravings of his genre paintings (made by artists such as François-Bernard Lépicié and P.-L. Sugurue), which brought Chardin income in the form of "what would now be called royalties". In 1744 he entered his second marriage, this time to Françoise-Marguerite Pouget. The union brought a substantial improvement in Chardin's financial circumstances. In 1745 a daughter, Angélique-Françoise, was born, but she died in 1746.

In 1752 Chardin was granted a pension of 500 livres by Louis XV. In 1756 Chardin returned to the subject of the still life. At the Salon of 1759 he exhibited nine paintings; it was the first Salon to be commented upon by Denis Diderot, who would prove to be a great admirer and public champion of Chardin's work. Beginning in 1761, his responsibilities on behalf of the Salon, simultaneously arranging the exhibitions and acting as treasurer, resulted in a diminution of productivity in painting, and the showing of 'replicas' of previous works. In 1763 his services to the Académie were acknowledged with an extra 200 livres in pension. In 1765 he was unanimously elected associate member of the Académie des sciences, belles-lettres et arts de Rouen, but there is no evidence that he left Paris to accept the honor. By 1770 Chardin was the 'Premier peintre du roi', and his pension of 1,400 livres was the highest in the academy. In the 1770s his eyesight weakened and he took to painting in pastels, a medium in which he executed portraits of his wife and himself (see Self-portrait at top right). His works in pastels are now highly valued.

In 1772 Chardin's son, also a painter, drowned in Venice, a probable suicide. The artist's last known oil painting was dated 1776; his final Salon participation was in 1779, and featured several pastel studies. Gravely ill by November of that year, he died in Paris on December 6, at the age of 80.

== Work ==
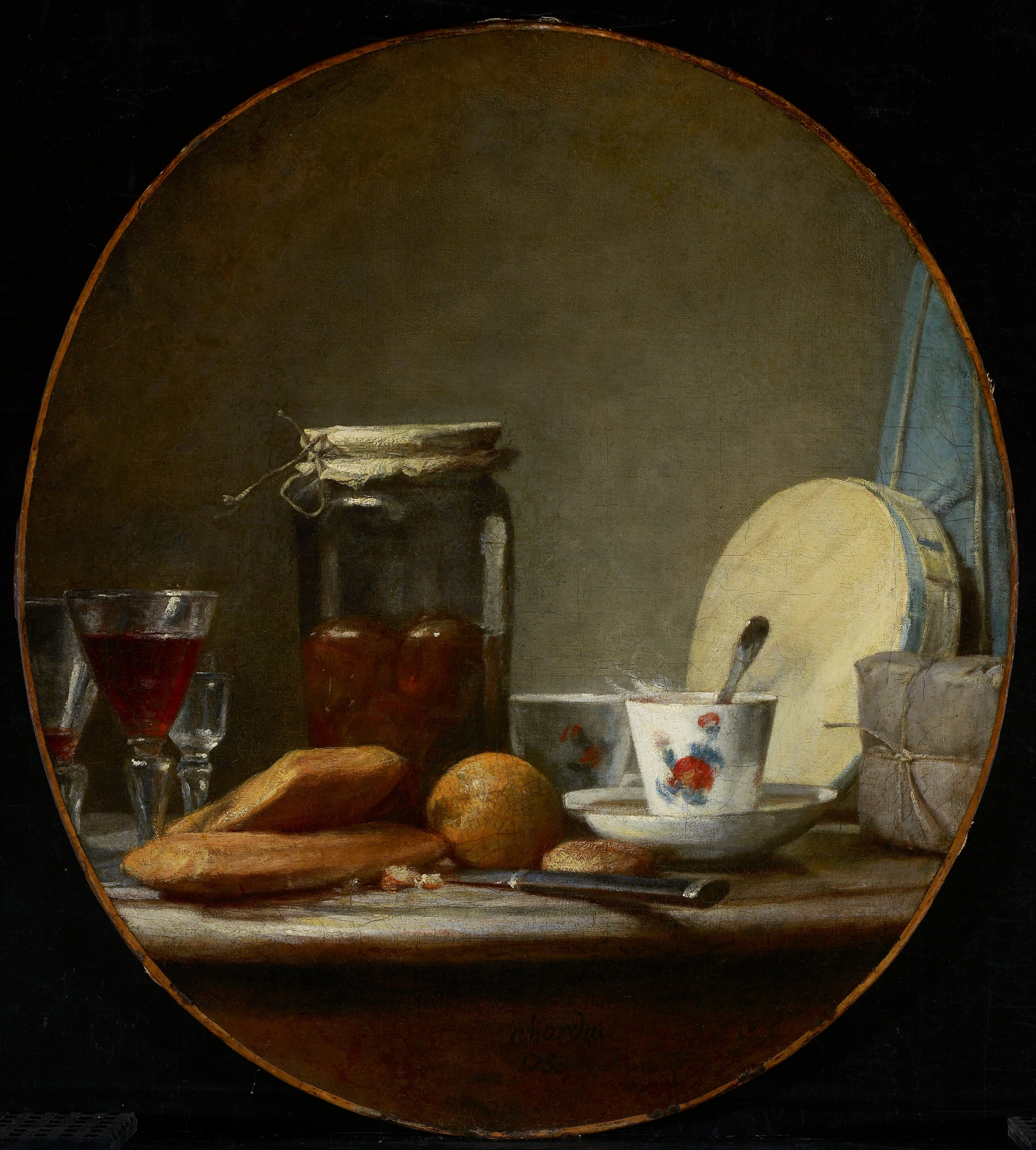
Jar of Apricots (1758), oil on canvas, 57 x 51 cm., Art Gallery of Ontario

The Sliced Melon (1760), oil on canvas, 57 x 52 cm., Louvre

Chardin worked very slowly and painted only slightly more than 200 pictures (about four a year) in total.

Chardin's work had little in common with the Rococo painting that dominated French art in the 18th century. At a time when history painting was considered the supreme classification for public art, Chardin's subjects of choice were viewed as minor categories. He favored simple yet beautifully textured still lifes, and sensitively handled domestic interiors and genre paintings. Scholars have interpreted Chardin's domestic genre paintings as embodying Enlightenment values through their emphasis on modesty, industriousness, and moral virtue in everyday life. Simple, even stark, paintings of common household items (Still Life with a Smoker's Box) and an uncanny ability to portray children's innocence in an unsentimental manner (Boy with a Top [right]) nevertheless found an appreciative audience in his time, and account for his timeless appeal.

Largely self-taught, Chardin was greatly influenced by the realism and subject matter of the 17th-century Low Country masters. Despite his unconventional portrayal of the ascendant bourgeoisie, early support came from patrons in the French aristocracy, including Louis XV. Though his popularity rested initially on paintings of animals and fruit, by the 1730s he introduced kitchen utensils into his work (The Copper Cistern, c. 1735, Louvre). Soon figures populated his scenes as well, supposedly in response to a portrait painter who challenged him to take up the genre. Woman Sealing a Letter (ca. 1733), which may have been his first attempt, was followed by half-length compositions of children saying grace, as in Le Bénédicité, and kitchen maids in moments of reflection. These humble scenes deal with simple, everyday activities, yet they also have functioned as a source of documentary information about a level of French society not hitherto considered a worthy subject for painting. The pictures are noteworthy for their formal structure and pictorial harmony. Chardin said about painting, "Who said one paints with colors? One employs colors, but one paints with feeling."

A child playing was a favourite subject of Chardin. He depicted an adolescent building a house of cards on at least four occasions. The version at Waddesdon Manor is the most elaborate. Scenes such as these derived from 17th-century Netherlandish vanitas works, which bore messages about the transitory nature of human life and the worthlessness of material ambitions, but Chardin's also display a delight in the ephemeral phases of childhood for their own sake.

Chardin frequently painted replicas of his compositions—especially his genre paintings, nearly all of which exist in multiple versions which in many cases are virtually indistinguishable. Beginning with The Governess (1739, in the National Gallery of Canada, Ottawa), Chardin shifted his attention from working-class subjects to slightly more spacious scenes of bourgeois life. Chardin's extant paintings, which number about 200, are in many major museums, including the Louvre.

== Influence ==
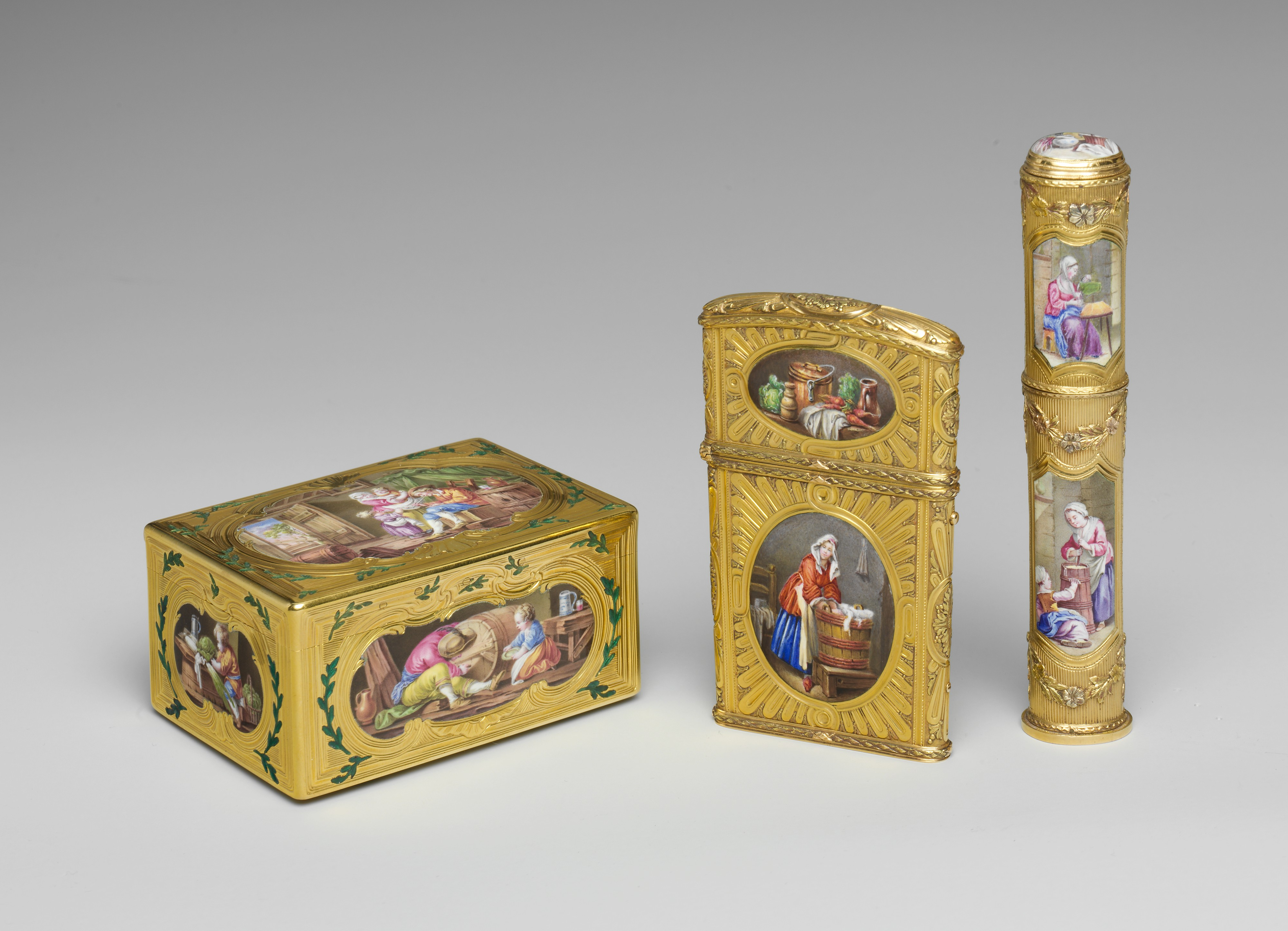
Enameled box and other objects painted after the style of Chardin

Chardin's influence on the art of the modern era was wide-ranging and has been well-documented. Édouard Manet's half-length Boy Blowing Bubbles and the still lifes of Paul Cézanne are equally indebted to their predecessor. He was one of Henri Matisse's most admired painters; as an art student Matisse made copies of four Chardin paintings in the Louvre. Chaïm Soutine's still lifes looked to Chardin for inspiration, as did the paintings of Georges Braque, and later, Giorgio Morandi. In 1999 Lucian Freud painted and etched several copies after The Young Schoolmistress (National Gallery, London).

Marcel Proust, in the chapter "How to open your eyes?" from In Search of Lost Time (À la recherche du temps perdu), describes a melancholic young man sitting at his simple breakfast table. The only comfort he finds is in the imaginary ideas of beauty depicted in the great masterpieces of the Louvre, materializing fancy palaces, rich princes, and the like. The author tells the young man to follow him to another section of the Louvre where the pictures of Chardin are. There he would see the beauty in still life at home and in everyday activities like peeling turnips.

== Gallery ==
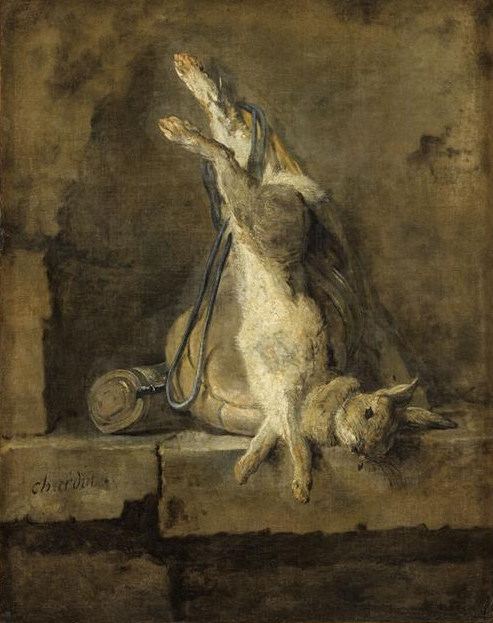
Dead Rabbit and Hunting Gear (ca. 1727), oil on canvas., 81 x 65 cm., Louvre

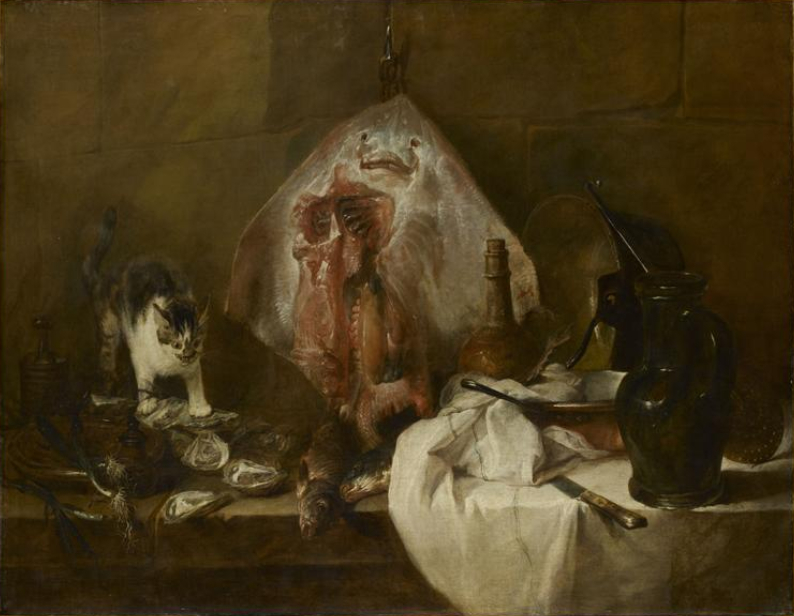
The Ray (1727), oil on canvas, 114.5 x 146 cm., Louvre

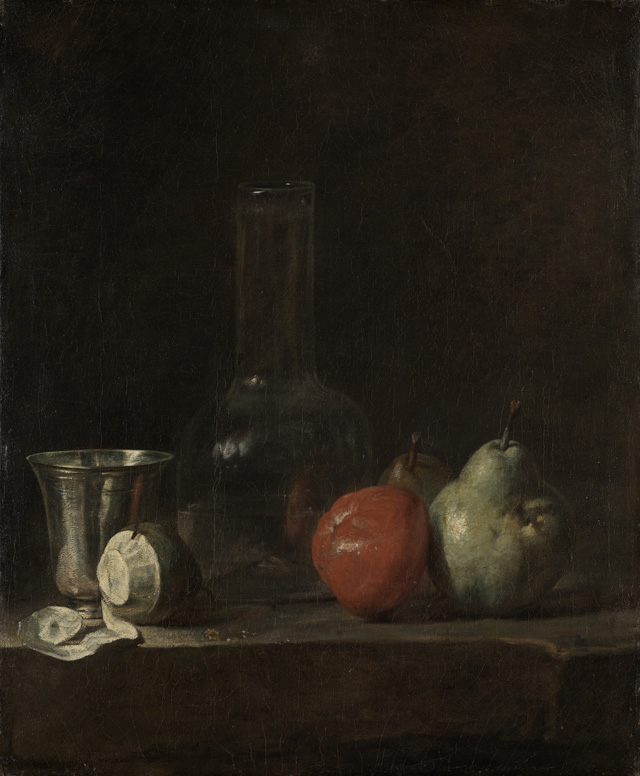
Glass Flask and Fruit (ca. 1728), oil on canvas, 55.7 x 46 cm., Staatliche Kunsthalle Karlsruhe

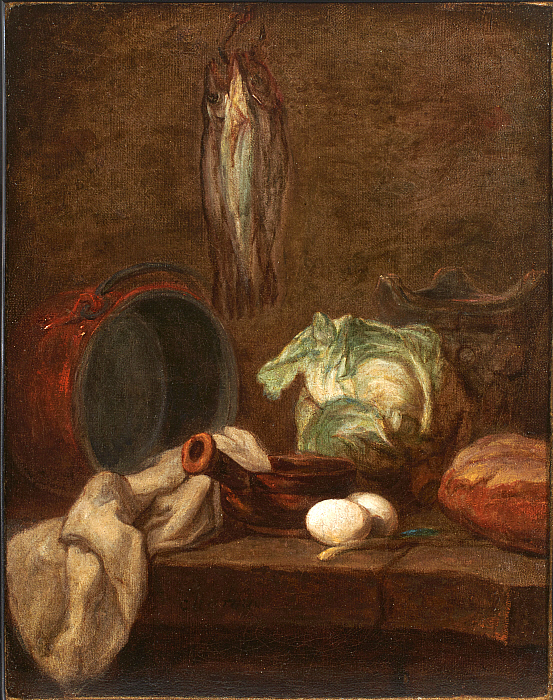
Kitchen Utensils and Three Herrings or Whitings (1729), oil on canvas, Clark Art Institute

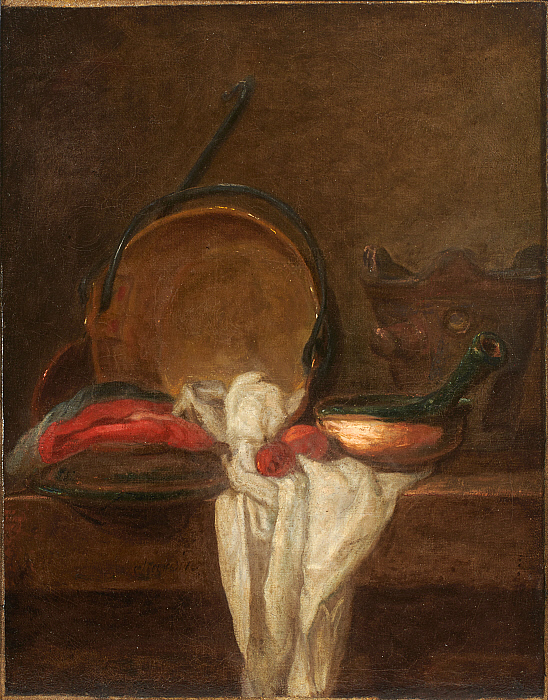
Cooking Pots and Ladle with a White Cloth (1729), oil on canvas, 15 3/8 x 12 1/8 in. (39.1 x 30.8 cm), Clark Art Institute

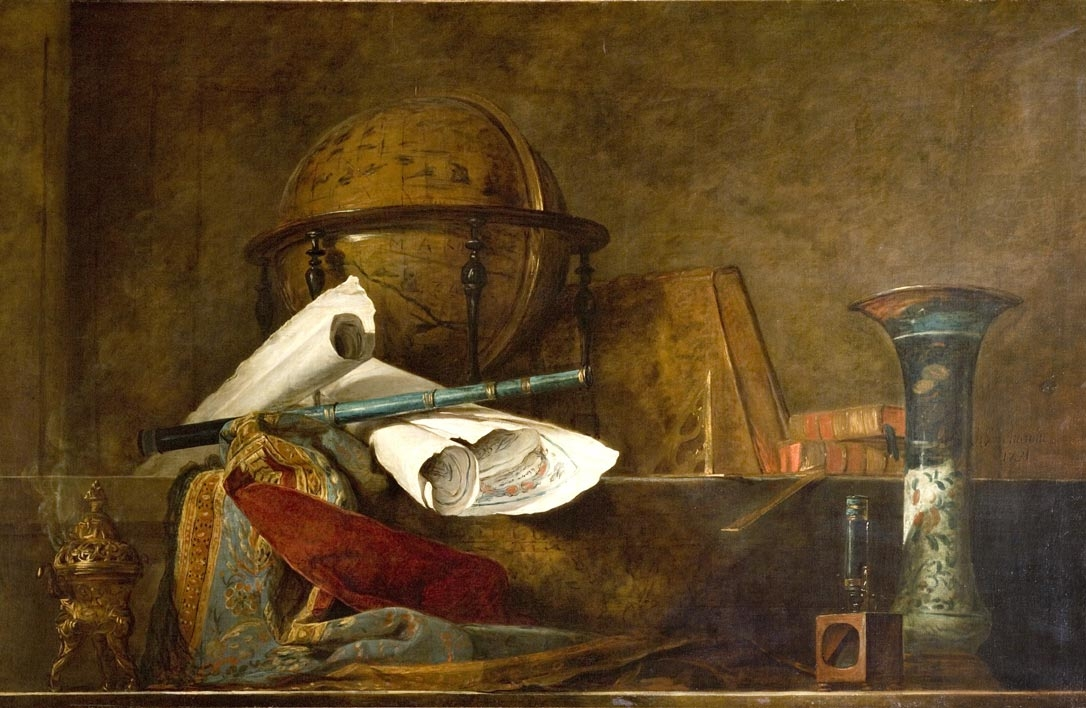
The Attributes of Exploration (1731), oil on canvas, 141 x 219 cm., Musée Jacquemart-André

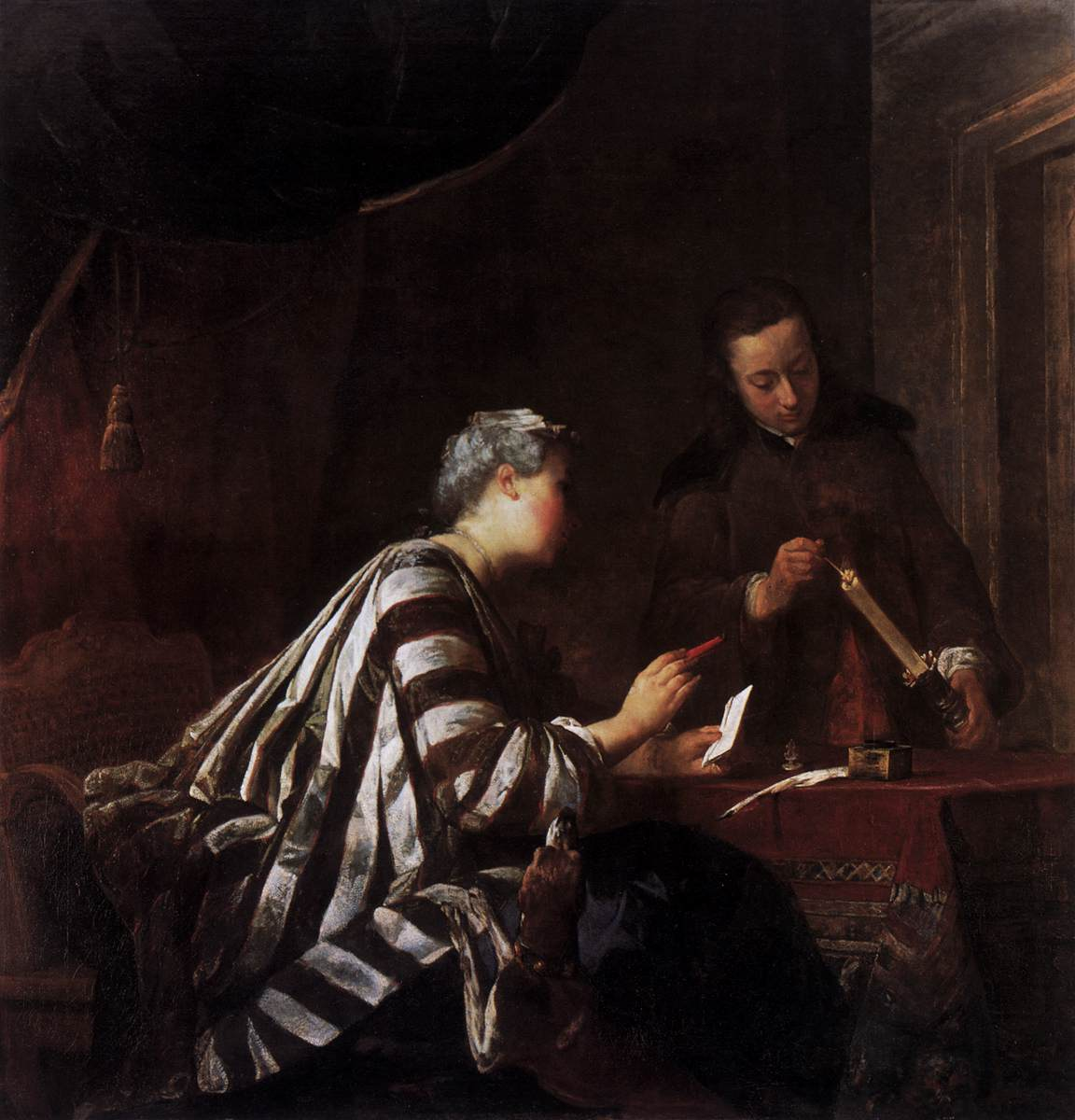
Sealing the Letter (1733), oil on canvas, 146 x 147 cm., Schloss Charlottenburg

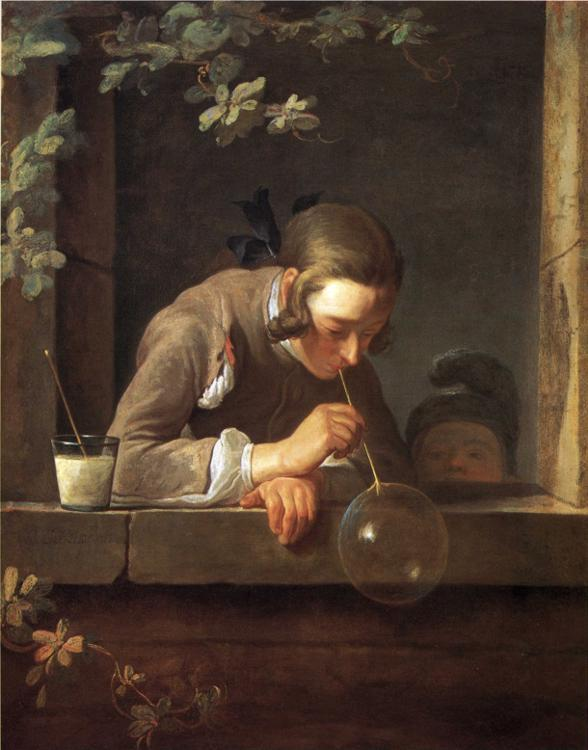
Soap Bubbles (ca.1733-1734), oil on canvas, 93 x 74.6 cm., National Gallery of Art

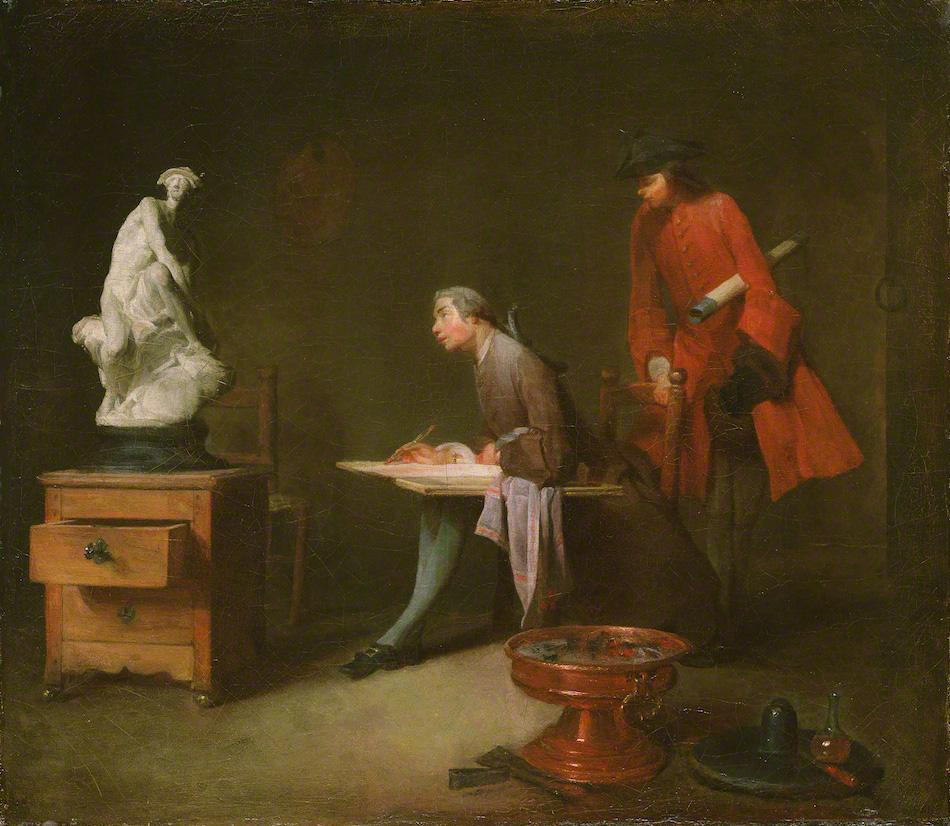
The Drawing Lesson (ca. 1734), oil on canvas, 41 × 47 cm., Tokyo Fuji Art Museum

Rabbit and Copper Pot (Made 1735 - 1739), oil on canvas, 59 x 56 cm., Nationalmuseum

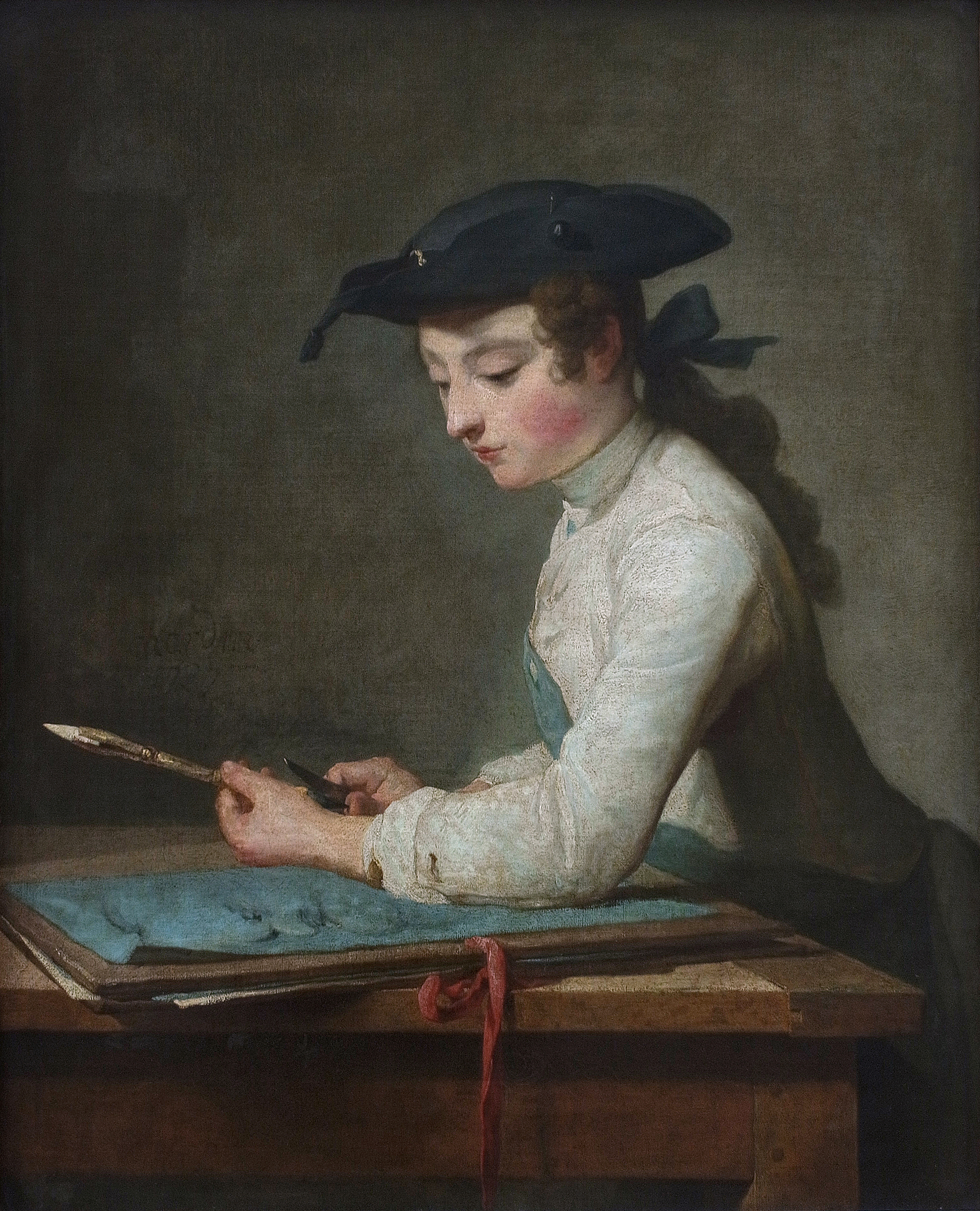
The Draftsman (1737), oil on canvas, 80 x 65 cm., Louvre

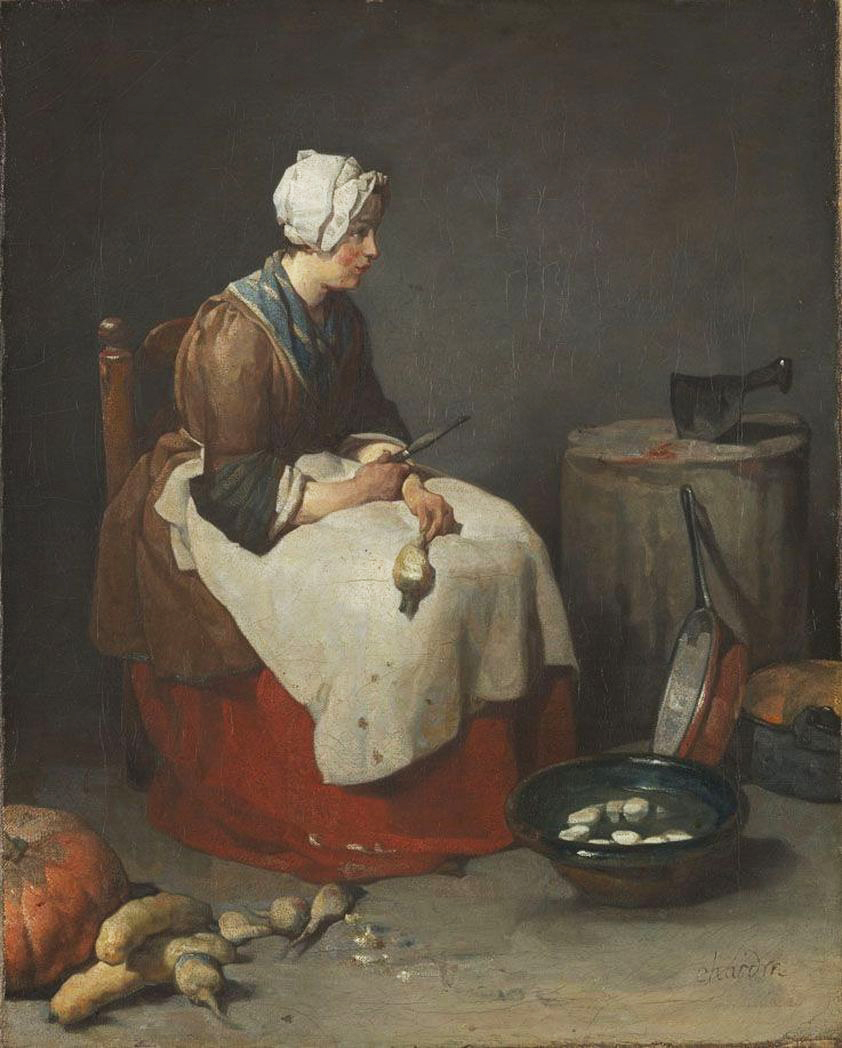
Woman Cleaning Turnips (ca. 1738), oil on canvas, 46.2 x 37 cm., Alte Pinakothek

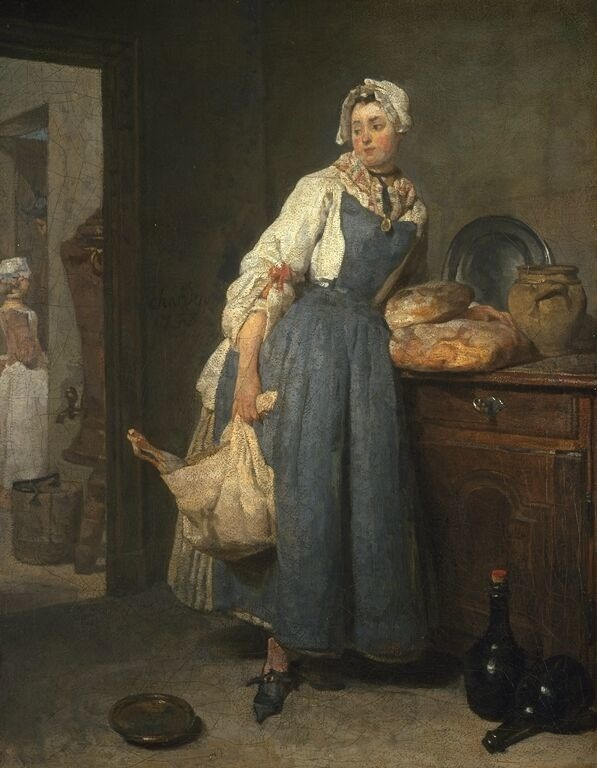
The Return from the Market (1738–39), oil on canvas, 47 x 38 cm., Louvre

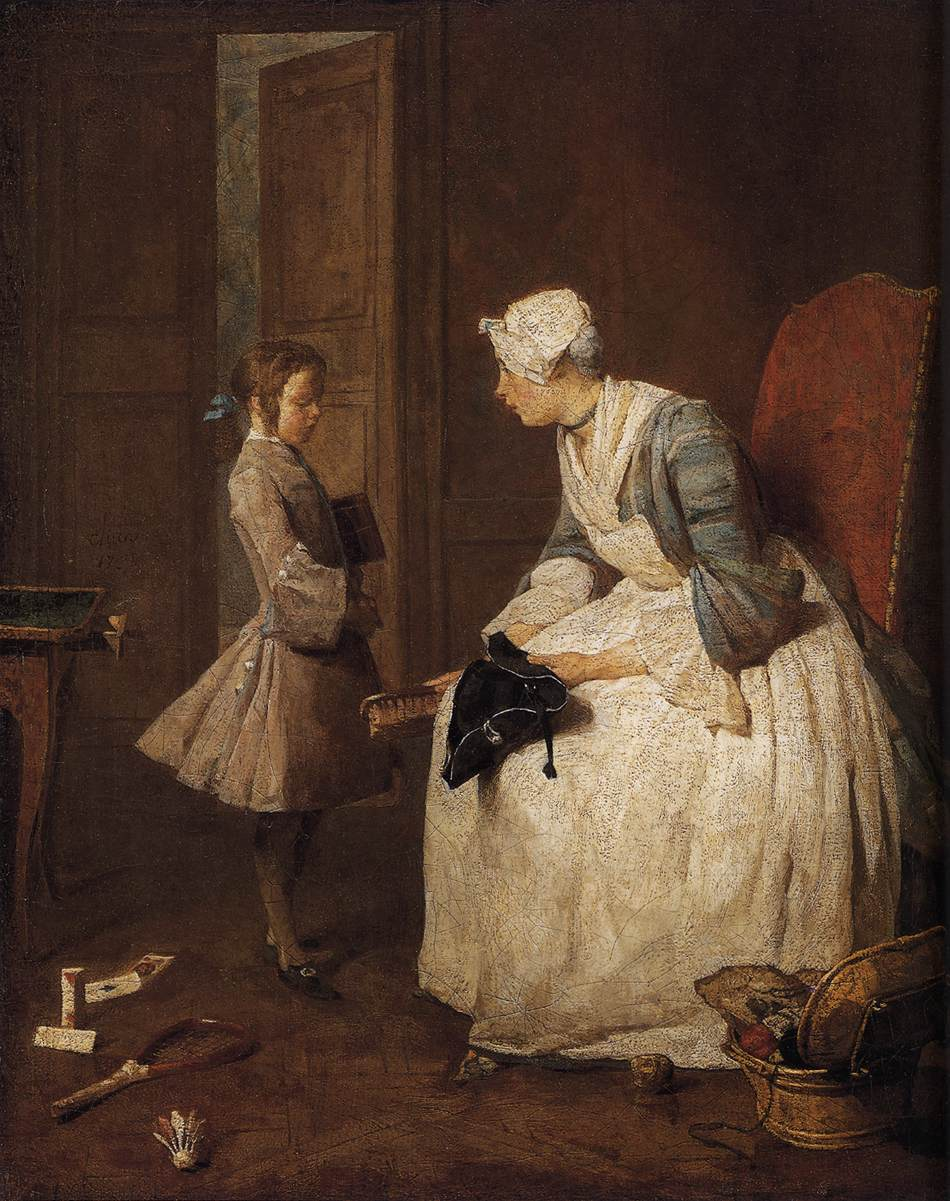
The Governess (1739), oil on canvas, 47 x 38 cm., National Gallery of Canada

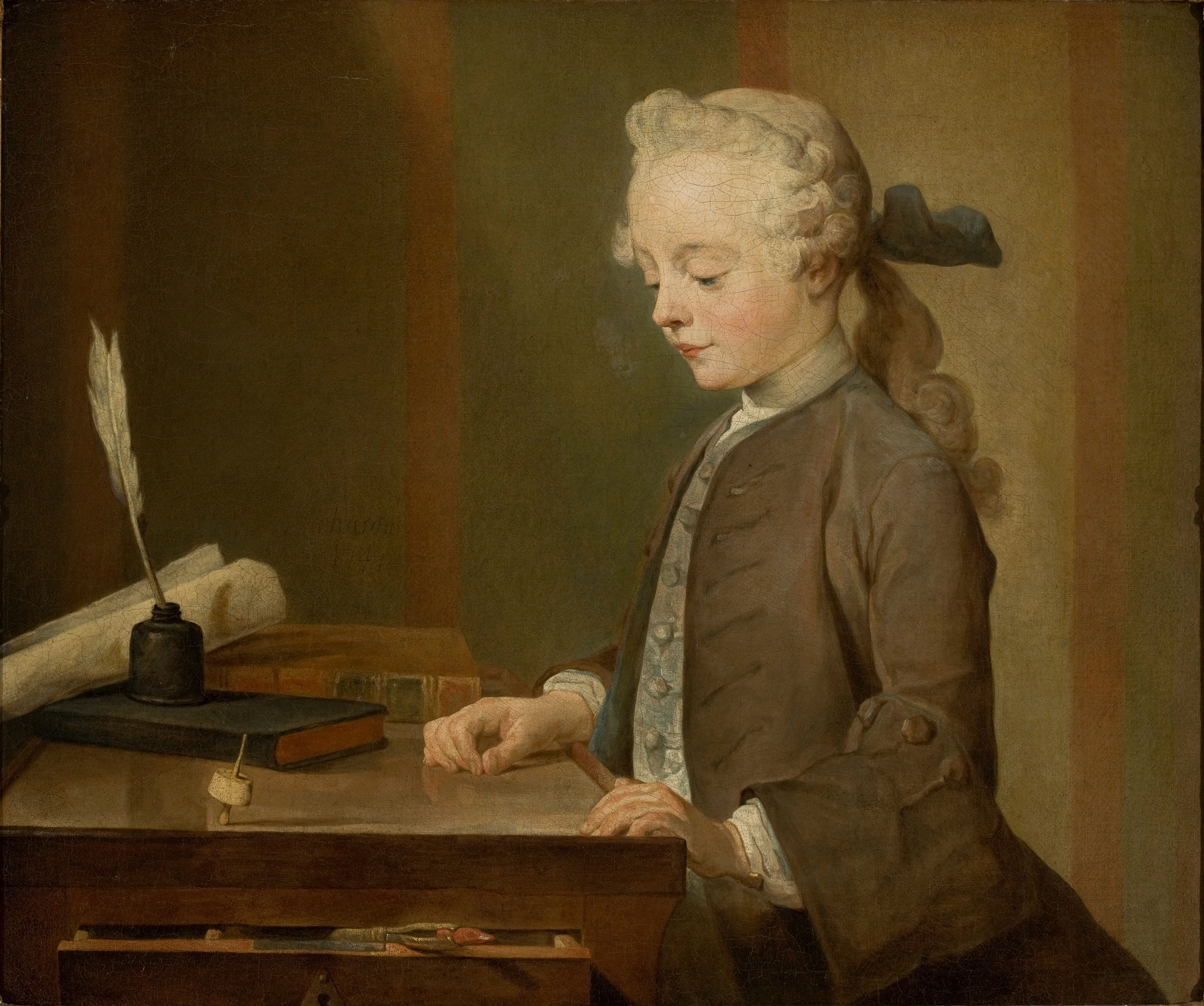
Portrait of Auguste Gabriel Godefroy (1741), oil on canvas, 64.5 x 76.5 cm., São Paulo Museum of Art

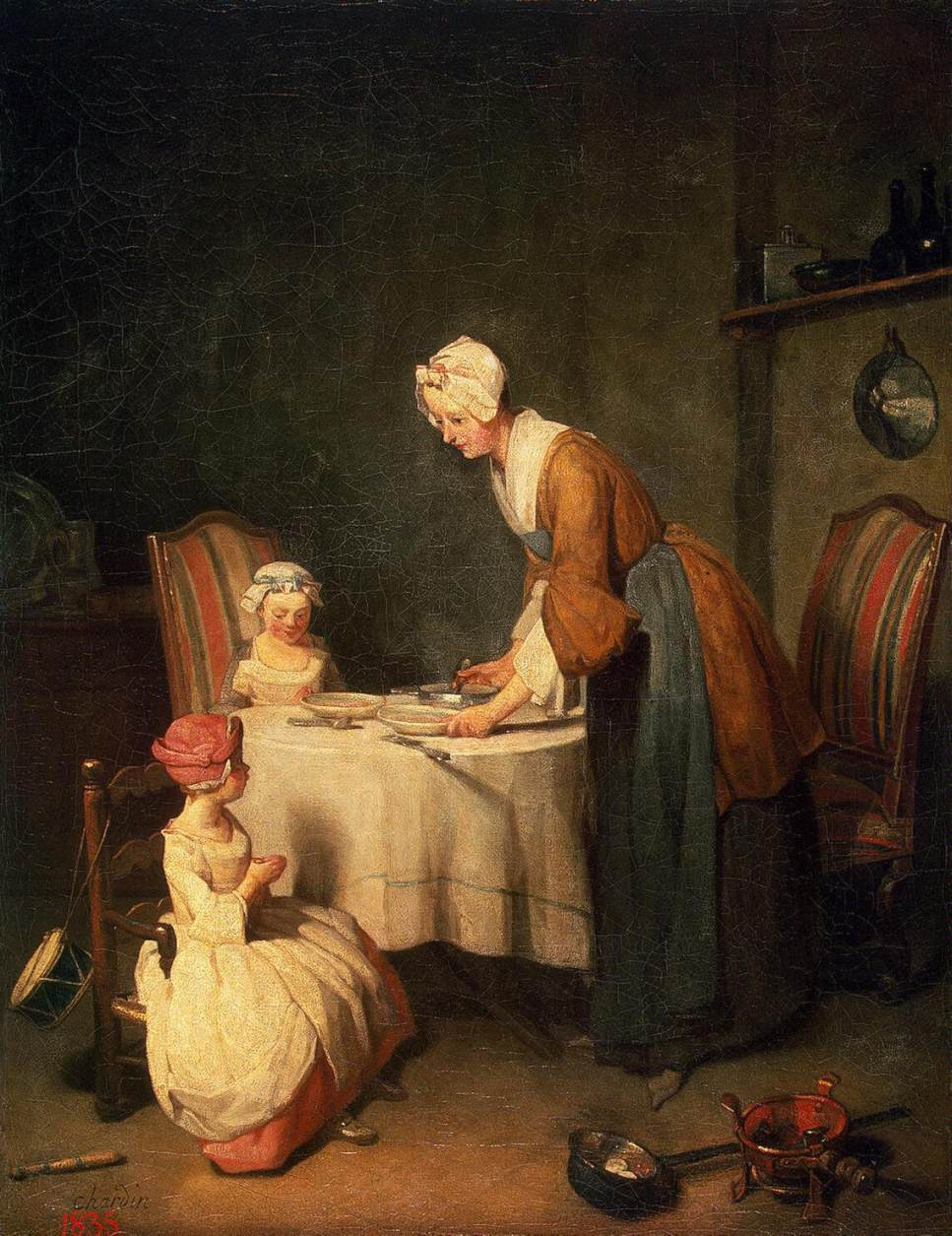
Saying Grace (1744), oil on canvas, 50 x 38 cm., Hermitage Museum

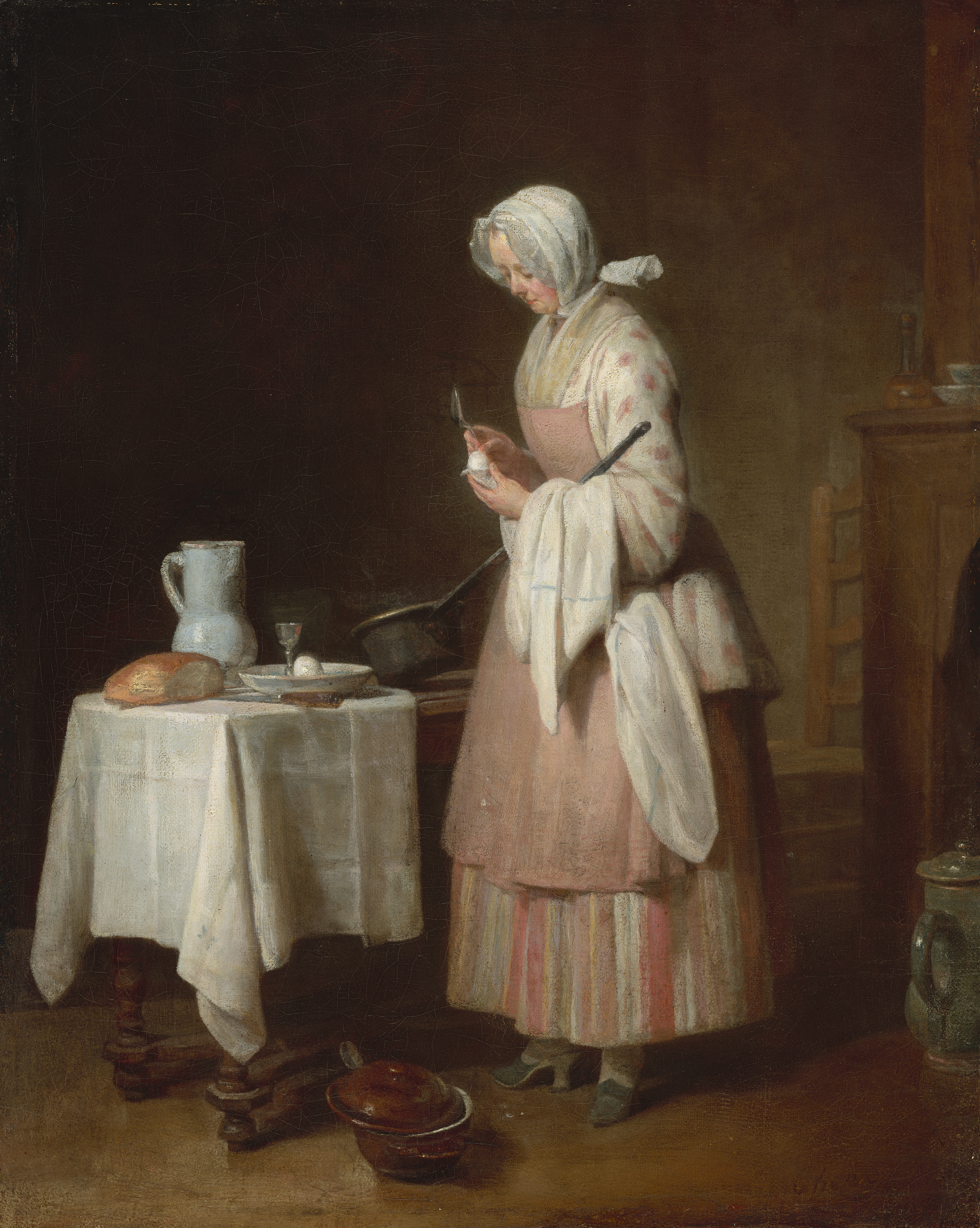
The Attentive Nurse (1747), oil on canvas, 46.2 x 37 cm., National Gallery of Art

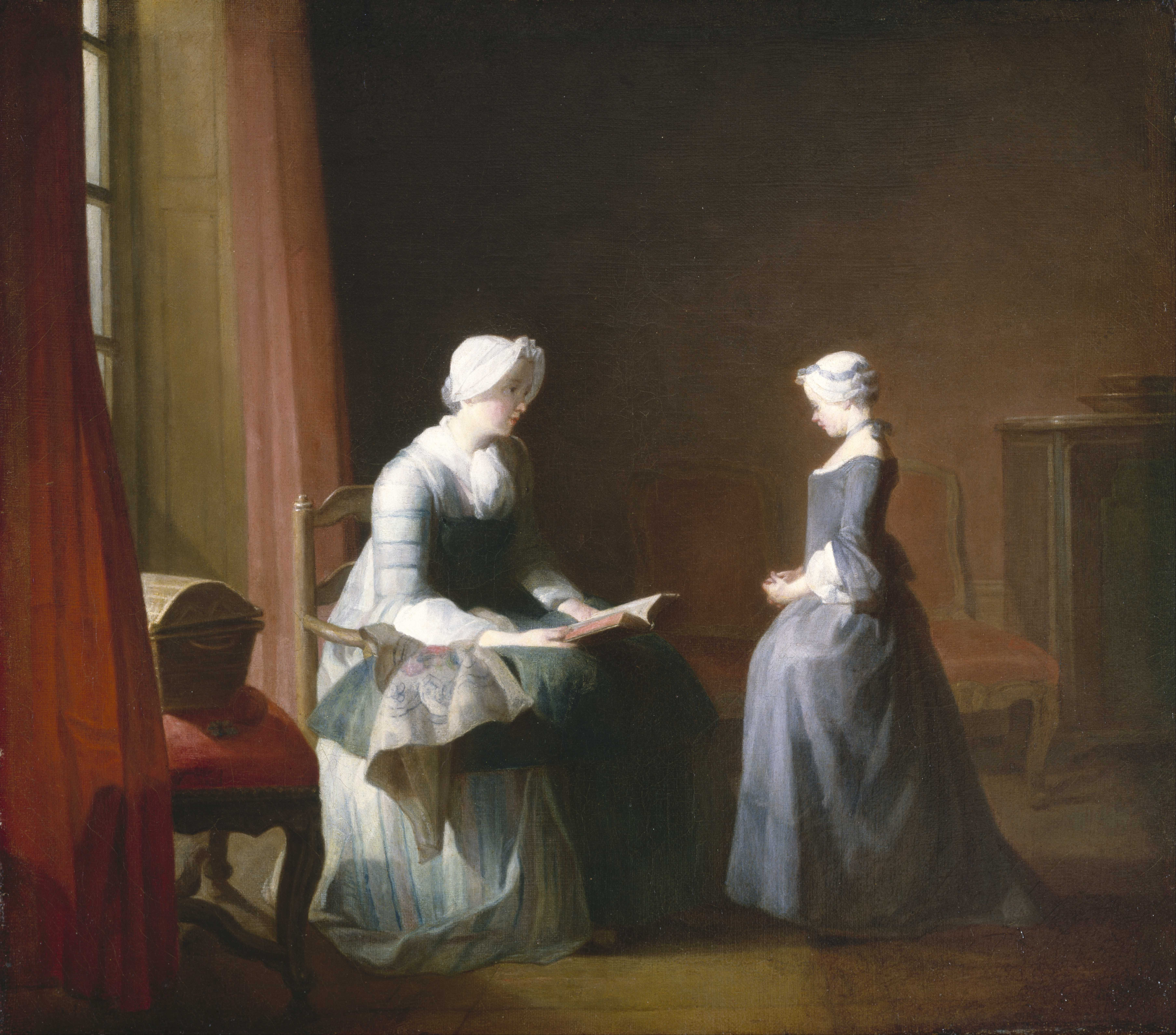
The Good Education (ca. 1753), oil on canvas, 43 x 47.3 cm., Museum of Fine Arts, Houston

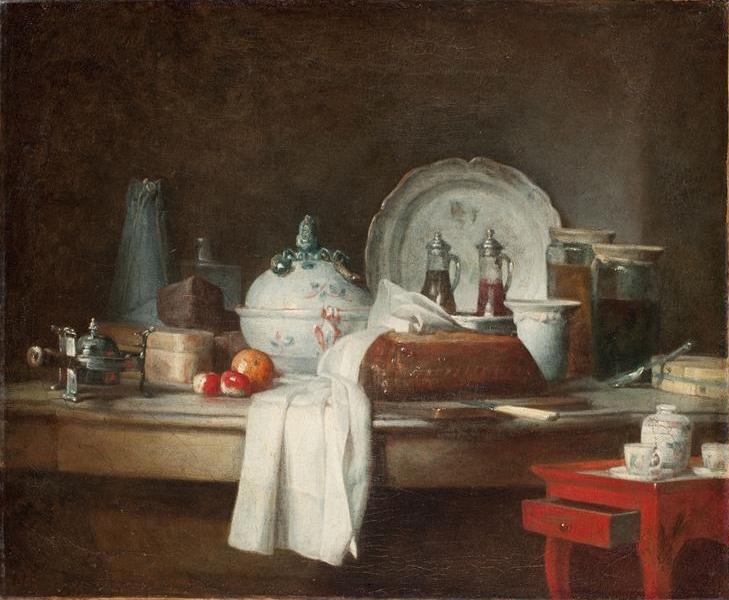
The Preparations of a Lunch (1756), oil on canvas, 38 × 46 cm., Musée des Beaux-Arts de Carcassonne

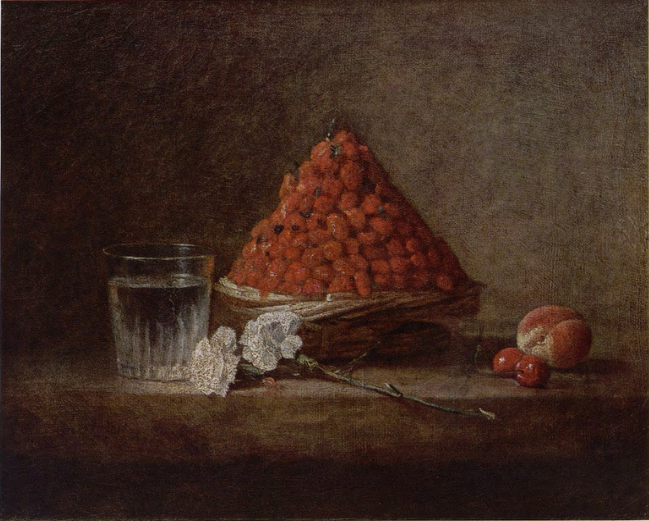
A Basket of Wild Strawberries (ca, 1760), oil on canvas, 38 x 46 cm., private collection

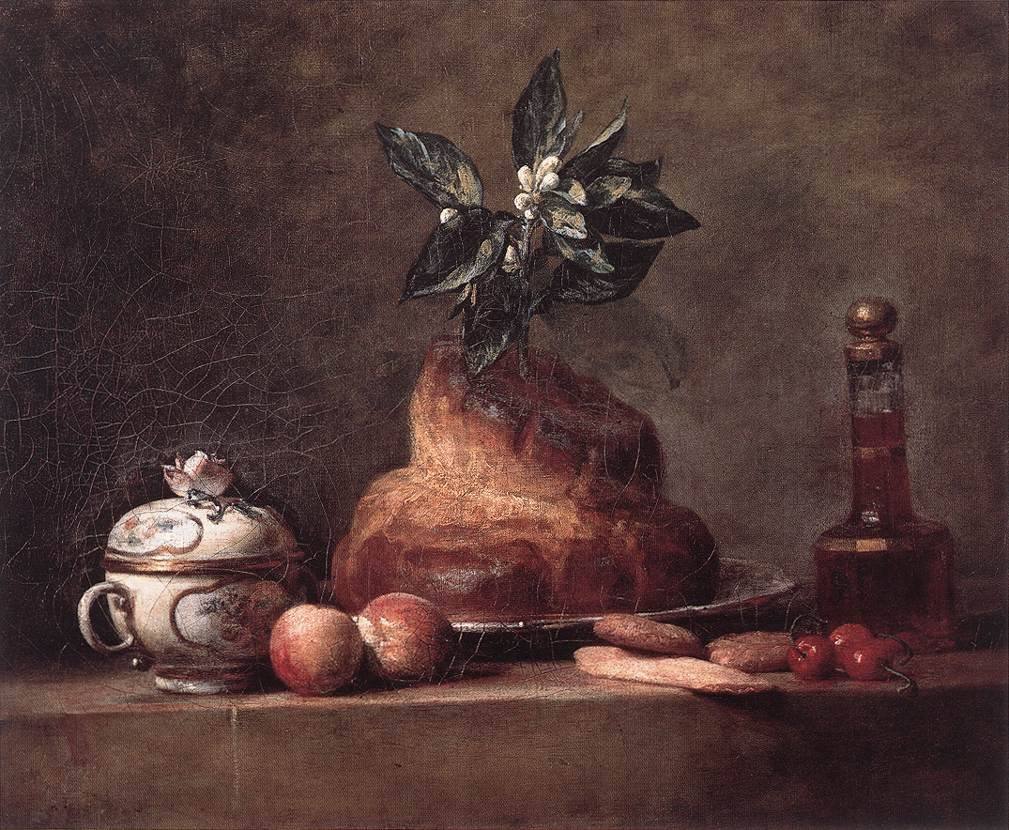
La Brioche (1763), oil on canvas, 47 x 56 cm., Louvre

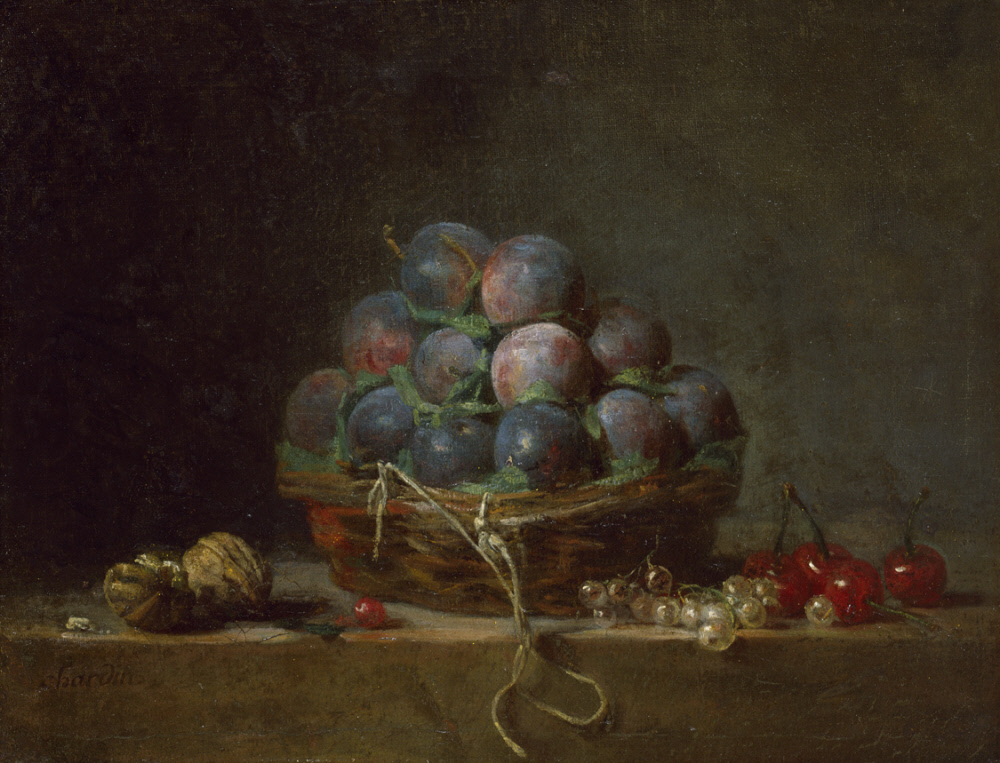
Basket of Plums (1765), oil on canvas, 32.4 x 41.9 cm., Chrysler Museum of Art

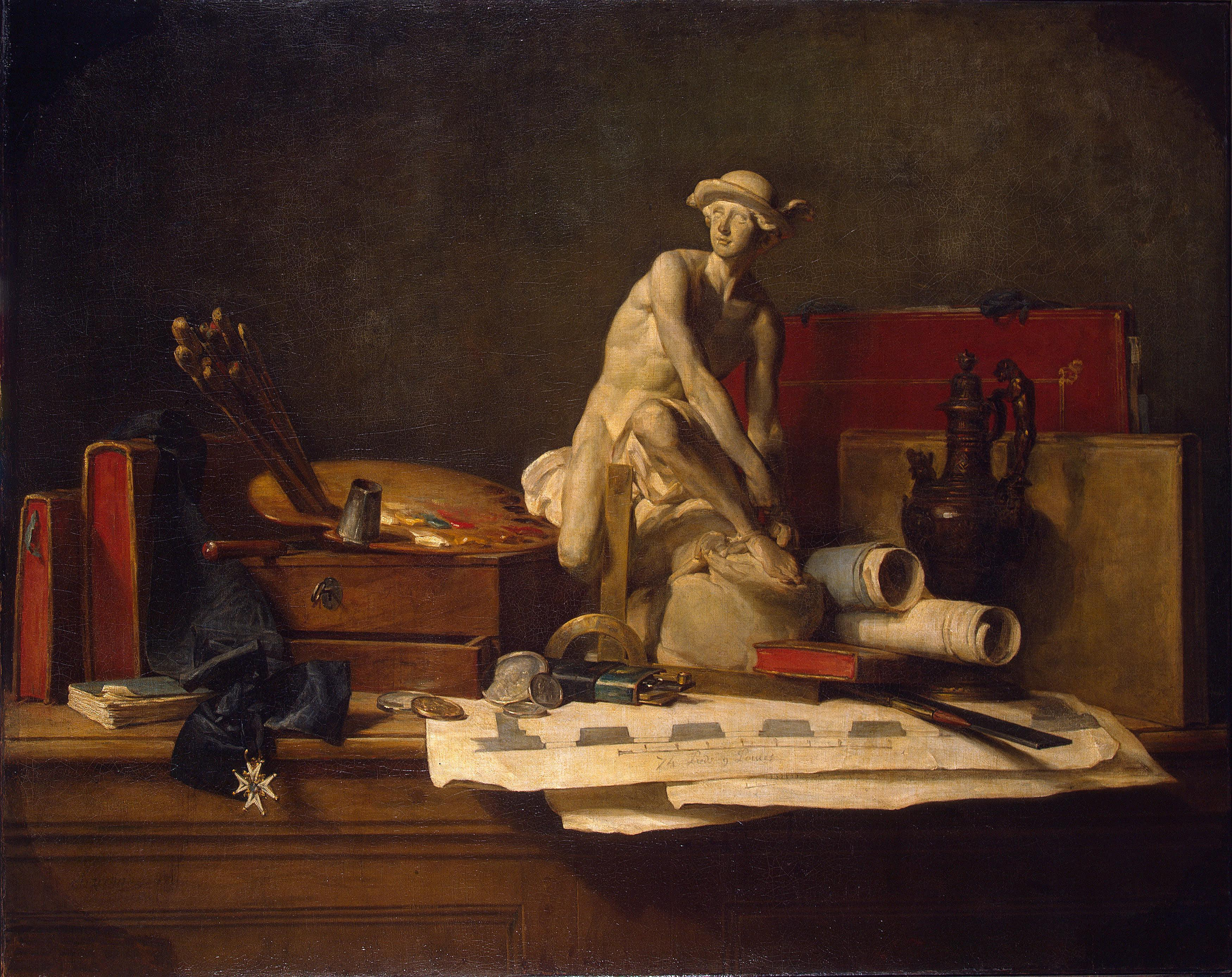
Still Life with Attributes of the Arts (1766), oil on canvas, 112 x 140.5 cm., Hermitage Museum

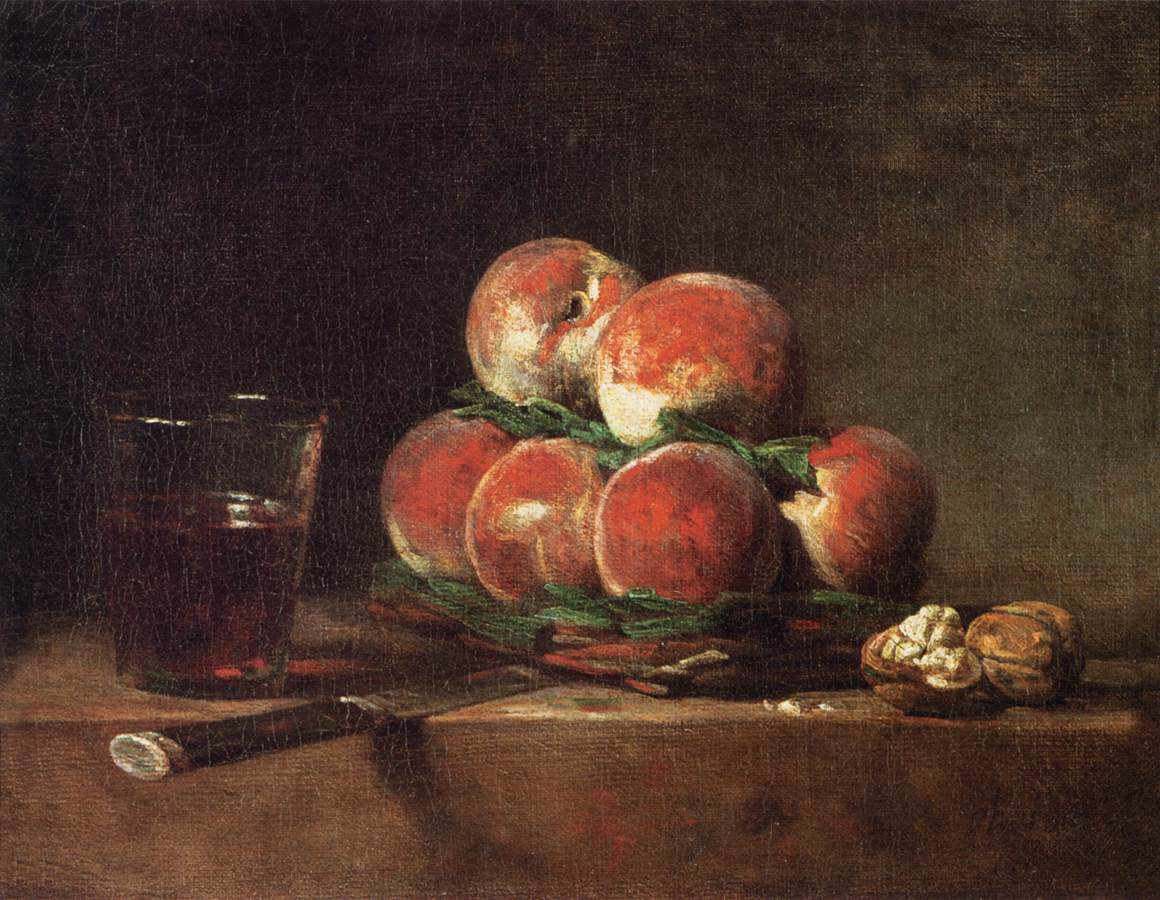
Basket of Peaches, with Walnuts, Knife and Glass of Wine (1768), oil on canvas, 32 x 39 cm., Louvre

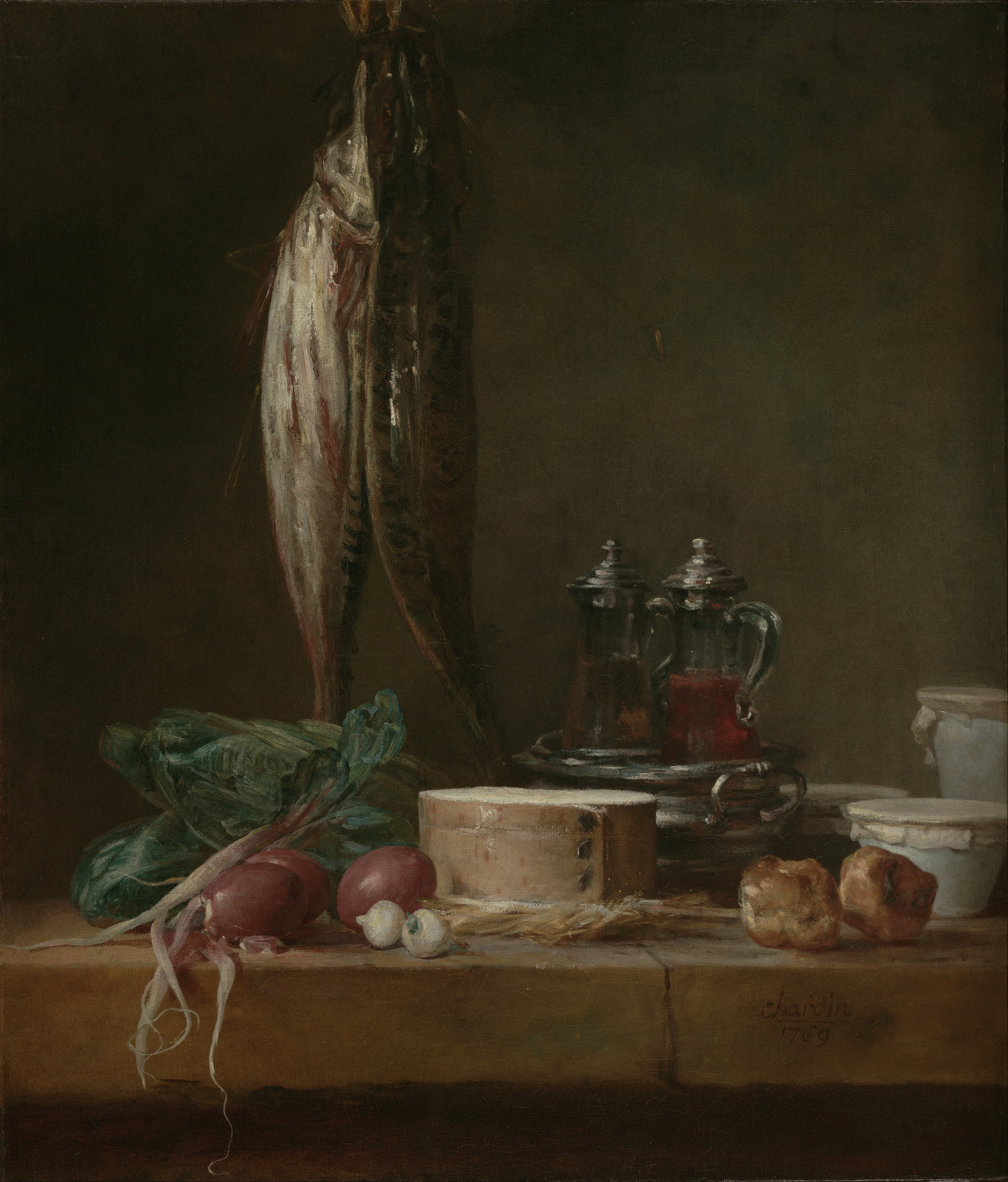
Still Life with Fish and Vegetables (1769), oil on canvas, 68.6 x 58.4 cm., J. Paul Getty Museum

== See also ==
- The Attributes of Civilian and Military Music
- Soap Bubbles (painting)
- The House of Cards
