= The Ray (Chardin) =

Painting by Jean Siméon Chardin

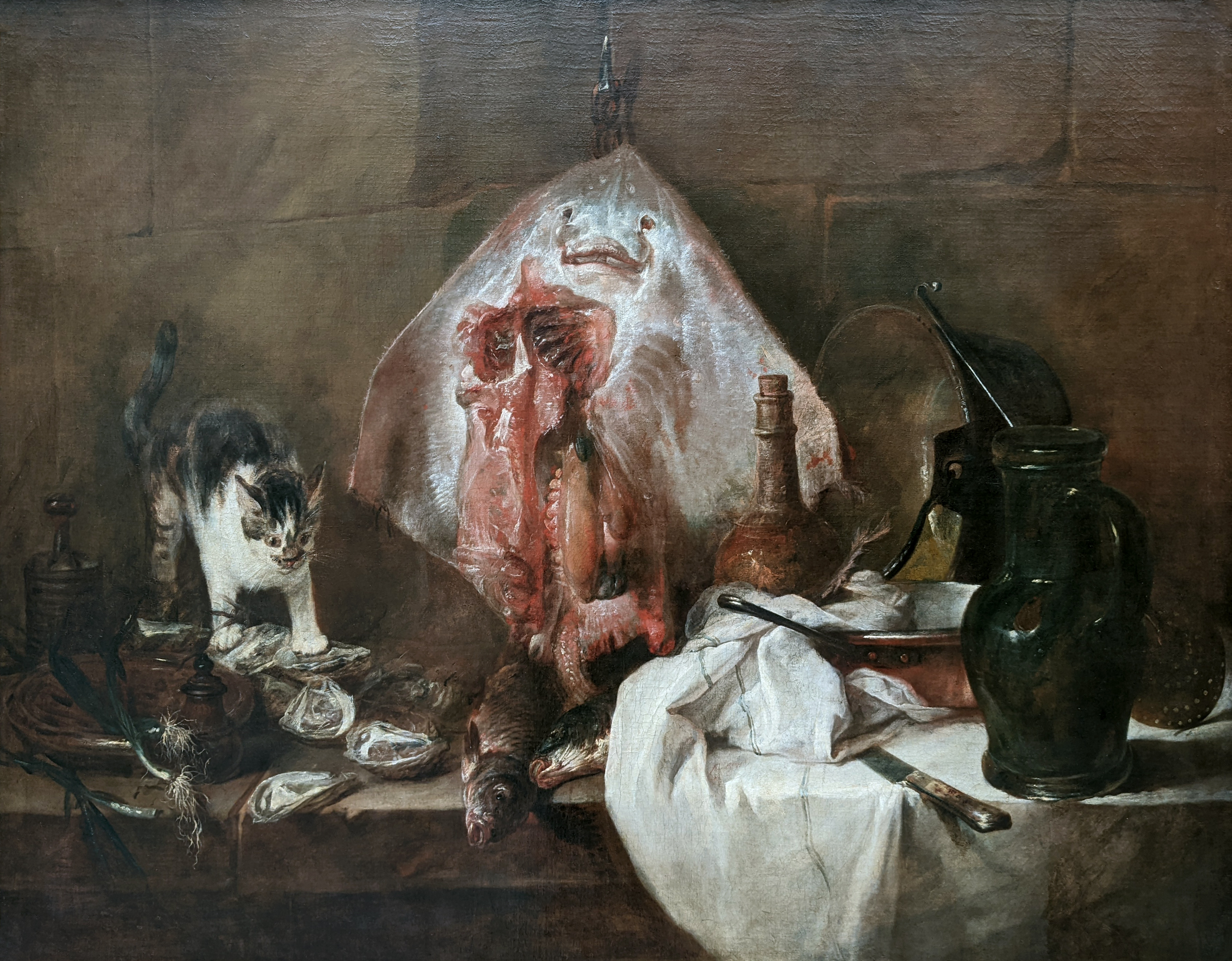
- Artist: Jean Siméon Chardin
- Year: 1728
- Medium: oil on canvas
- Dimensions: 114 cm × 146 cm (45 in × 57 in)
- Location: Louvre Museum, Paris

The Ray (French: La raie) is a still-life oil painting by the 18th-century French painter Jean Siméon Chardin depicting a gutted skate, suspended above a kitchen table, surrounded by an array of utensils, oysters, and other provisions. The piece is regarded as one of Chardin's most important still life works and played a vital role in his acceptance into the Académie royale de peinture et de sculpture in 1728. It was first exhibited at the Exposition de la Jeunesse [fr] on 3 June 1728 and has long been held by the Louvre in Paris.

This painting is widely noted for its visceral depiction of the lacerated skate, its emphasis on materiality and bodily interior, and the arrangement of domestic objects within a kitchen environment, which has been interpreted as challenging conventional approaches to still life painting in the eighteenth century.

== Exhibition ==
On 3 June 1728, the painting was first shown at the Exposition de la Jeunesse, a free, open-air exhibition held for a few hours at the corner of the Place Dauphine and the Pont Neuf each year on the day of Corpus Christi.

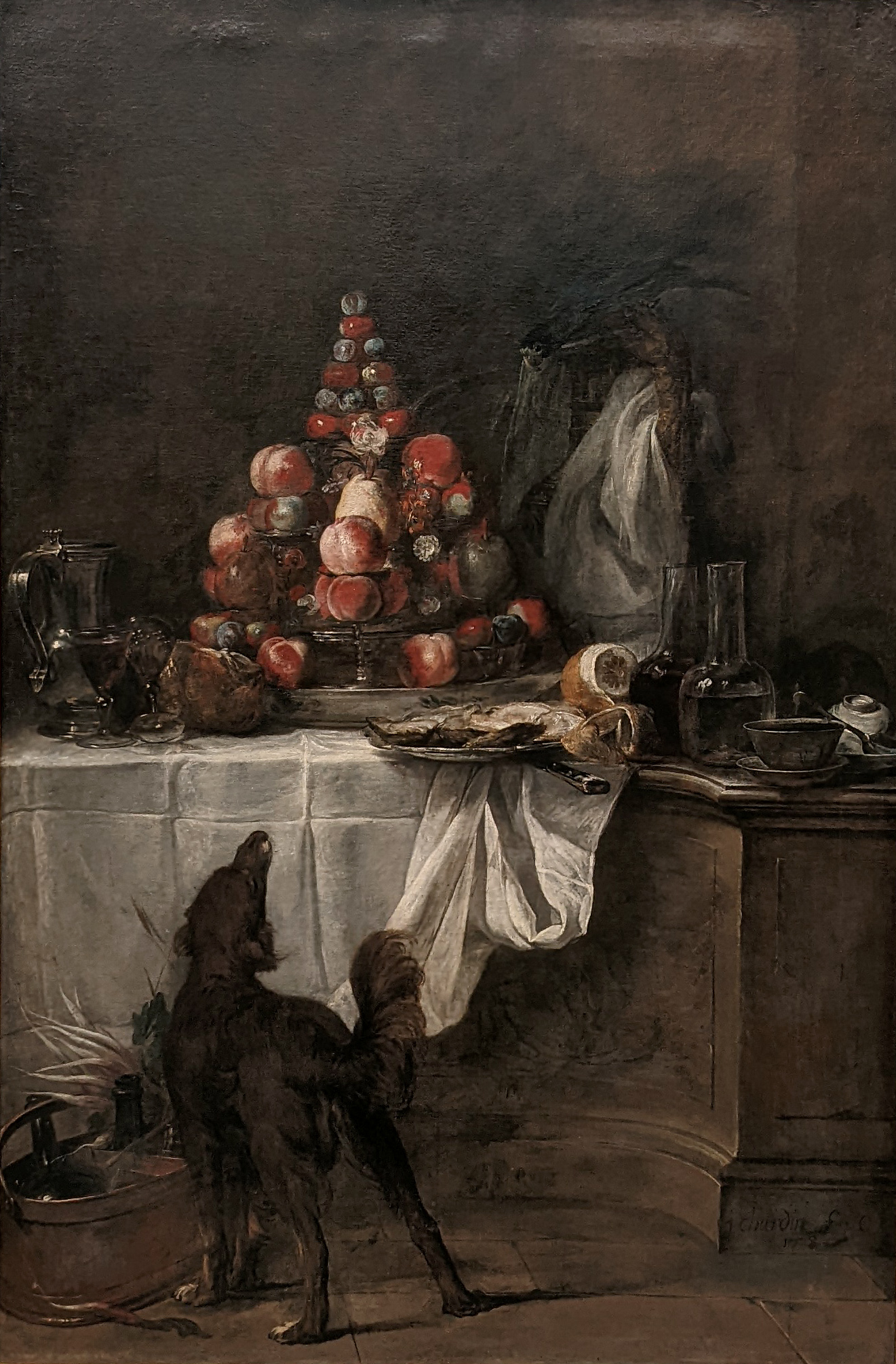
Le Buffet (1728), Jean-Baptiste-Siméon Chardin

On 25 September 1728, Chardin submitted several paintings to the Académie Royale de peinture et de sculpture, where The Ray and The Buffet were selected as his reception pieces. Chardin was accepted to the Academy on the same day, an unusually rapid admission process, and was placed among other notable painters from his generation. The Academy selected both still life works from a larger group of submitted paintings, choosing to pair The Ray with the more structurally conservative Buffet.

Both works remained with the Academy until the French Revolution, when they were moved to the new Muséum Central des Arts, now the Louvre, where The Ray remains on display.

== Reception ==
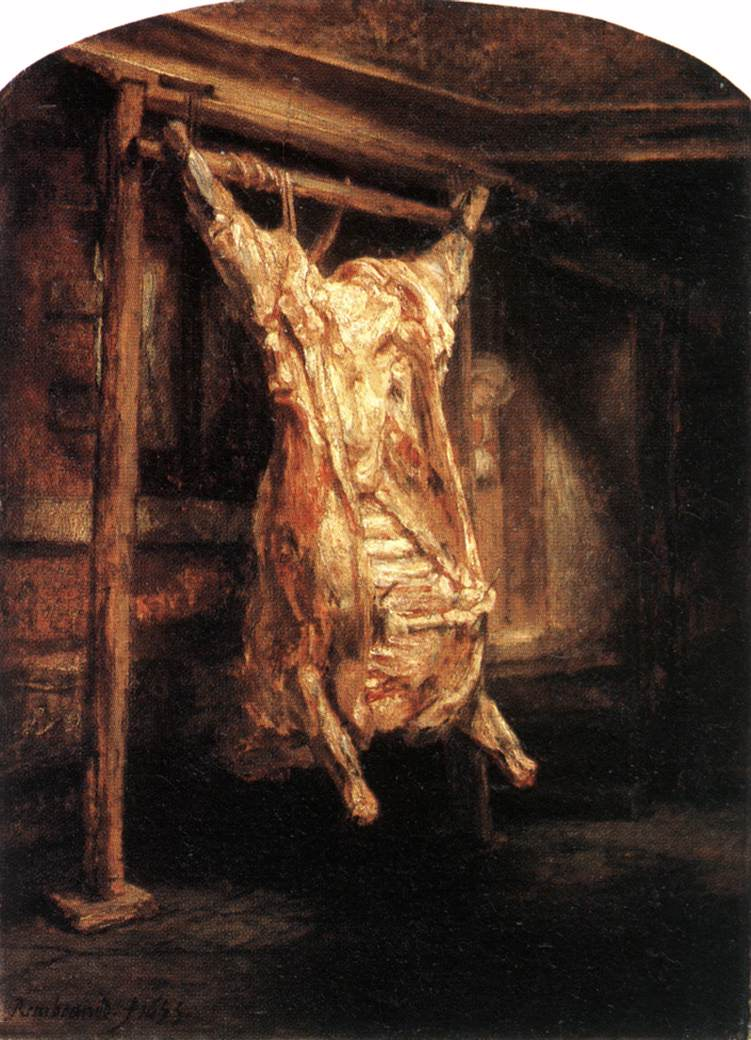
The Flayed Ox (1655), Rembrandt

Chardin was influenced by the Dutch still life paintings of the 17th century: the scene has been compared to Rembrandt's painting of the Slaughtered Ox. Although described by Diderot as "'disgusting", the peculiar but realistic composition was admired by other artists, including Matisse. Marcel Proust likened the image of the eponymous ray to the "nave of a polychromatic cathedral".

== Composition ==
Chardin depicts the bloody underside of a skate, gutted and hanging from a hook on the stone wall. The fish lies above a shelf on which there are various domestic items to the right on a white cloth: two metal pans, a ceramic jug, a bottle, and a knife. Below the skate are two other fish, and further to the left are some opened oysters and a cat with an arched back and raised fur, as if frightened by the sight.

The composition is arranged as an "ambitious pyramidal structure", with the pointed skate in the centre serving as the focal point from which the surrounding objects are distributed. Geometric elements structure the piece, with the ray forming a diamond and the stone wall of the background establishing a grid of rectangles. Some scholars have described this configuration as a "mortified" geometry, where these conventional shapes are altered by the macabre opening of the skate's mouth.

Depth is achieved within this piece through an "inside/out" foundation. Within this technique, Chardin draws attention to the stone ledge by balancing the handles of kitchenware in a precarious manner, actively threatening the stability of the scene portrayed.

Scholars have also related the technical execution of the work to the theme of consumption. Analysis of the paint application suggests Chardin used a tactile application method, employing his hands and fingertips rather than traditional brushes to bring out the "sticky chewiness" of the white highlights. This technique allowed Chardin to transform the paint into realistic flesh.

== Interpretation ==
Many modern scholars address the skate's unnerving resemblance to a human face. The forward-oriented nature of the skate's gills work to convey the appearance of what Daniel Cottom describes as "a face caught in the tragic rictus of a grin". This is further represented with the skate's gills appearing as "eyes" oriented forward within the painting, causing the ray to mimic a human-like facial structure.

Art historian Ewa Lajer-Burcharth argues that Chardin used the "violence" of the disemboweled ray fish to counteract the "feminine sphere" of the "maternal kitchen". This representation was used to reflect the tension of gender identity within Chardin's life. Through such imagery, he worked to combat the passive title of "eternal son", still residing in his parents' household, in order to reemphasize his agency.

According to Lajer-Burcharth, this gendered message is further reinforced by the painting's sexual nature. The gaping wound of the ray operates as a "gruesome" presentation of a female genital organ. Such imagery worked to challenge the idealized gender roles of the 18th century often depicted in contemporary art, with sons following in the professional suit of their father's and daughters taking on the domestic duties of a household. The Ray, by contrast, is viewed as reflecting a "far more complex" atmosphere present in the artisanal household.
