= Caroline de Valory =

French painter and engraver

- Born: 1790
- Died: Unknown

Caroline de Valory, née D'Ette (born 1790) was a French painter and engraver.

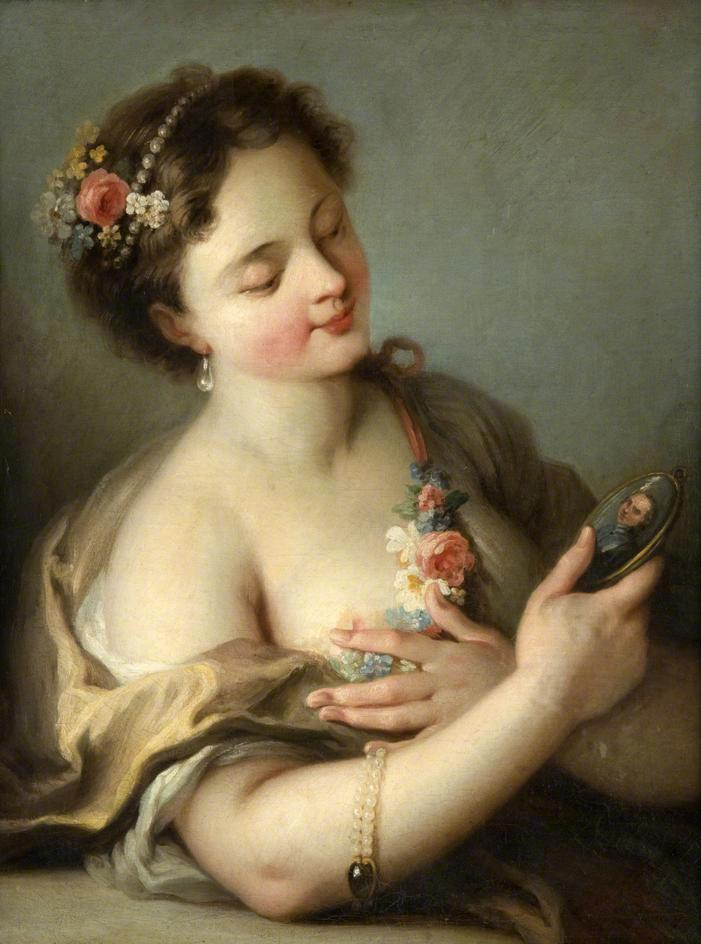
The Miniature

She was a pupil of Jean-Baptiste Greuze and married the writer Count Henri de Valory, known for his documentation of the order of St. John (he was a knight of the order) and his military history of Henry IV. Her husband illustrated his books with engravings, and some assume these were by her hand. Caroline also wrote plays and is known for Céline de Saint-Albe, and Lisady de Rainville (3 volumes, 1814). She worked with the writer Alexandre Louis Bertrand Robineau, called Beaunoir, most notably on L'Accordée de village, a one-act comedy surrounding the 6 moralistic paintings by her former teacher Greuze that he presented at the Paris Salon of 1761, making a sensation with the one called L'Accordée de Village, that became popular in print and gave its name to the play.

Her painting The Miniature, in the Glasgow Gallery, was included in the 1905 book Women Painters of the World.
