= Fortune (Reni) =

Painting series by Guido Reni

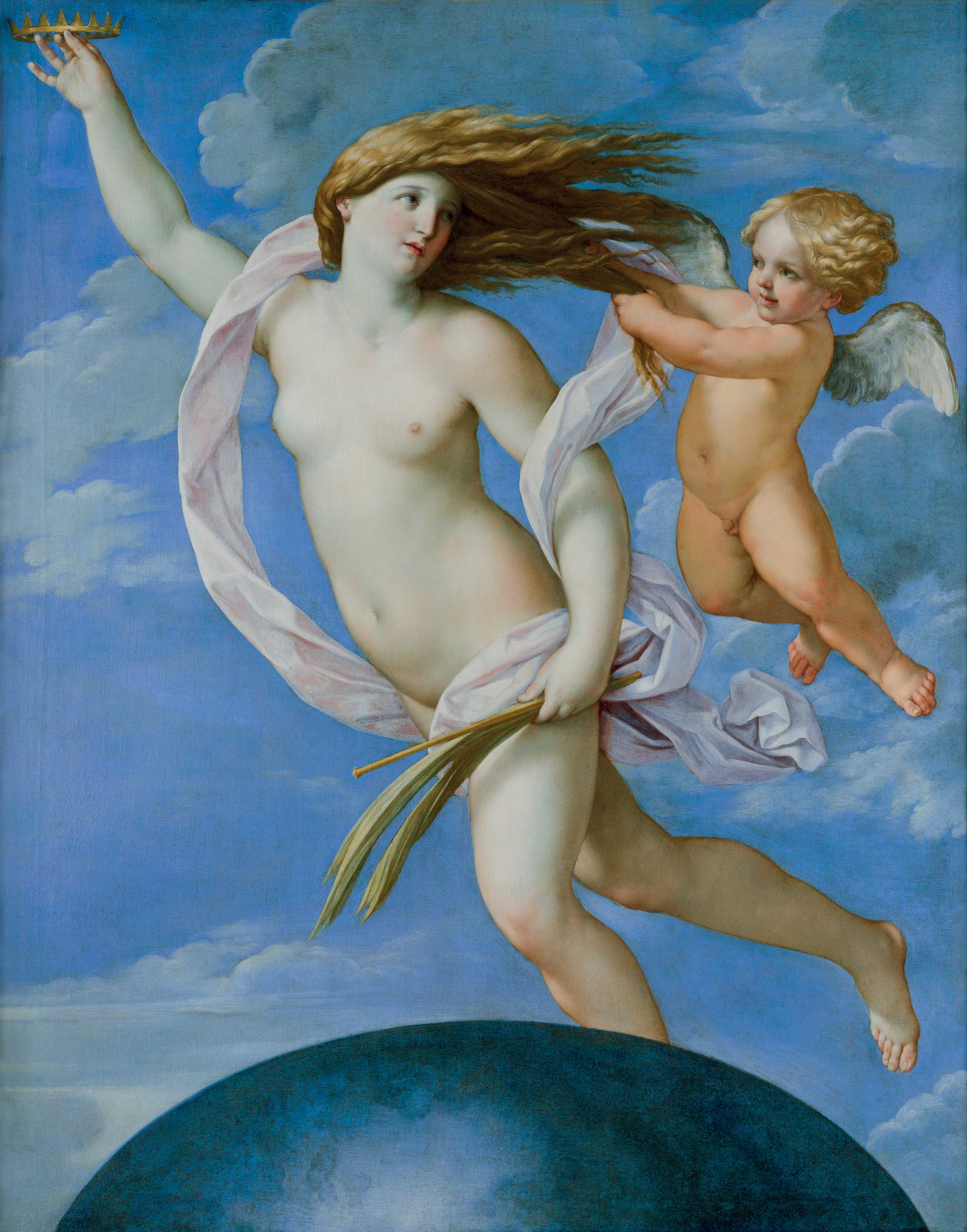
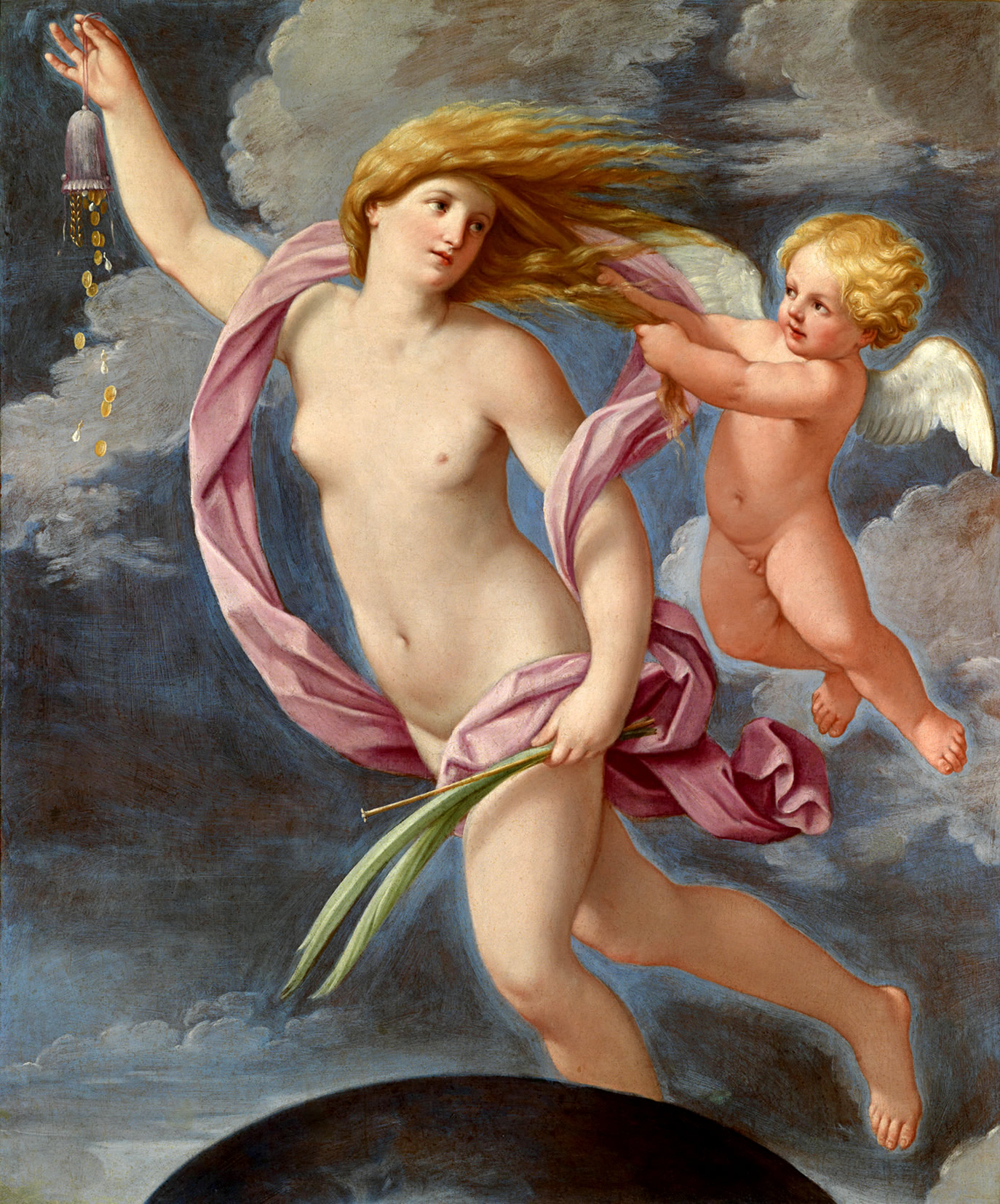

Fortune (Italian: La Fortuna) may refer to several, similar pictures by or after Guido Reni, a painter of the Bologna school, dated to the 1620s or 1630s.

The prime version is in the National Academy of Saint Luke, Rome. There are several replicas by Reni or others in private hands.

== Prime version ==
This Fortune, once one of the profane subjects in the secret cabinet of the Capitol, has been described by Righetti. During the Napoleonic period of spoliation it was removed to Paris.

Aristide Sartorio (1911) considers it a "valuable decorative picture, suggestive in its tonality of certain works of Puvis de Chavannes, who … was an admirer of diffuse colouring without violent chiaroscuro effects."

== Sources ==
- Pepper, Stephen; Mahon, Denis (1999). "Guido Reni's 'Fortuna with a Purse' Rediscovered"". The Burlington Magazine. 141 (1152): 156–63.
- Sartorio, Aristide (1911). The Gallery of St. Luke. Musei E Gallerie D'Italia — Num 9–10. Rome: Gaetano Garzoni Provenzani. p. xv.
- "Allegory of Fortune, holding a crown". Christie's. Live Auction 17292. Old Masters Evening Sale. Lot 36. 3 December 2019.
