= The Village Bride =

Painting by Jean-Baptiste Greuze

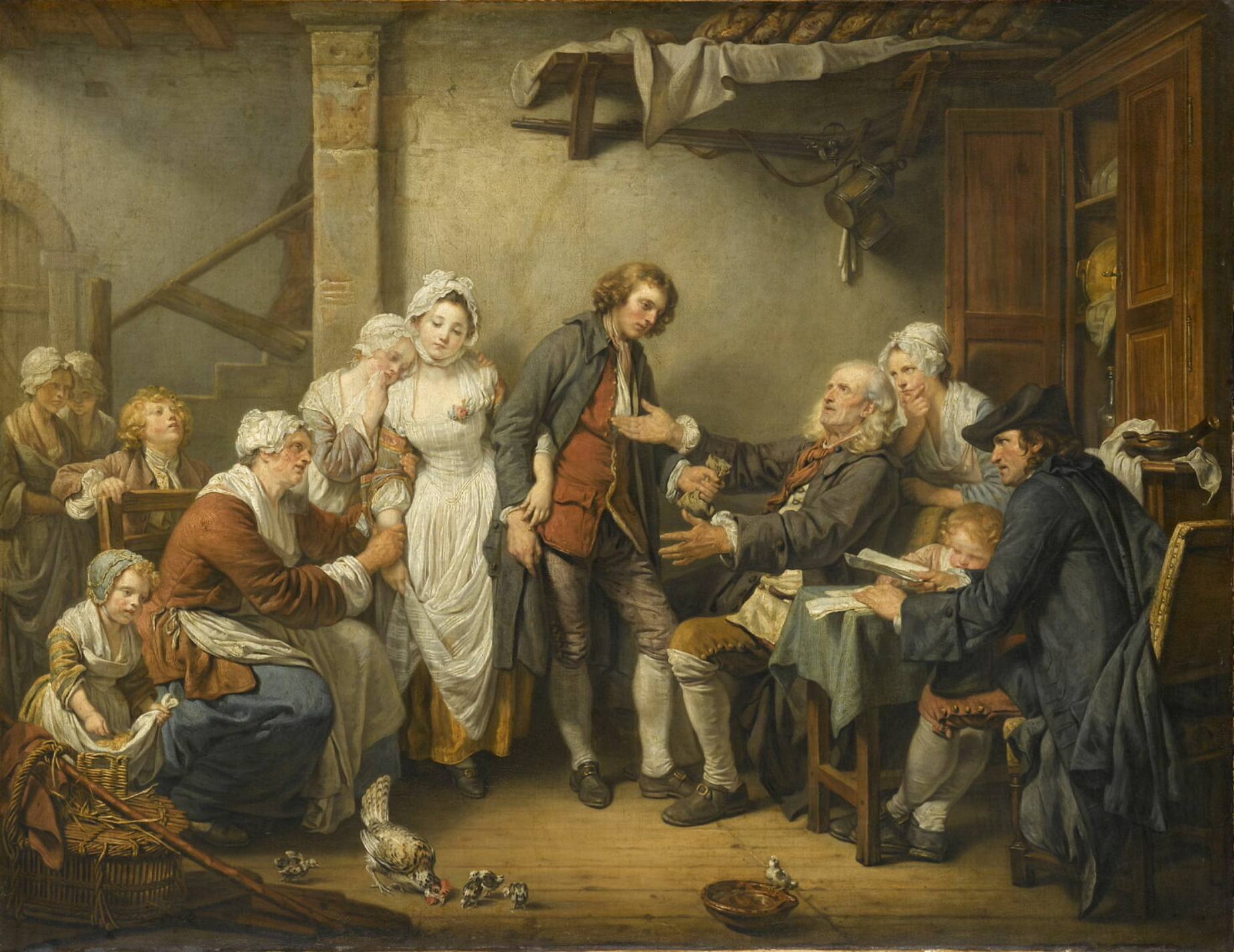
- Artist: Jean-Baptiste Greuze
- Year: 1761
- Medium: Oil on canvas
- Dimensions: 92 cm (36 in) × 117 cm (46 in) × 7.7 cm (3.0 in)
- Owner: French State
- Collection: Department of Paintings of the Louvre
- Accession no.: INV 5037
- Identifiers: Joconde work ID: 000PE001363; RKDimages ID: 302277; Bildindex der Kunst und Architektur ID: 20364954

The Village Bride (French: L'Accordée de Village) is a painting by the French artist Jean-Baptiste Greuze, created in 1761. It is now in the Louvre, in Paris. The work was first exhibited at the Salon of 1761, where it was unanimously praised by the critics, notably by Diderot. It was the first example of the 'moral painting' genre, to which Greuze often returned.

It was part of a series of 6 paintings. Caroline de Valory, a former pupil of Greuze, collaborated with the writer Alexandre Louis Bertrand Robineau to produce L'Accordée de Village, a one-act comedy based on the paintings.
