= Salon of 1761 =

1761 art exhibition in Paris

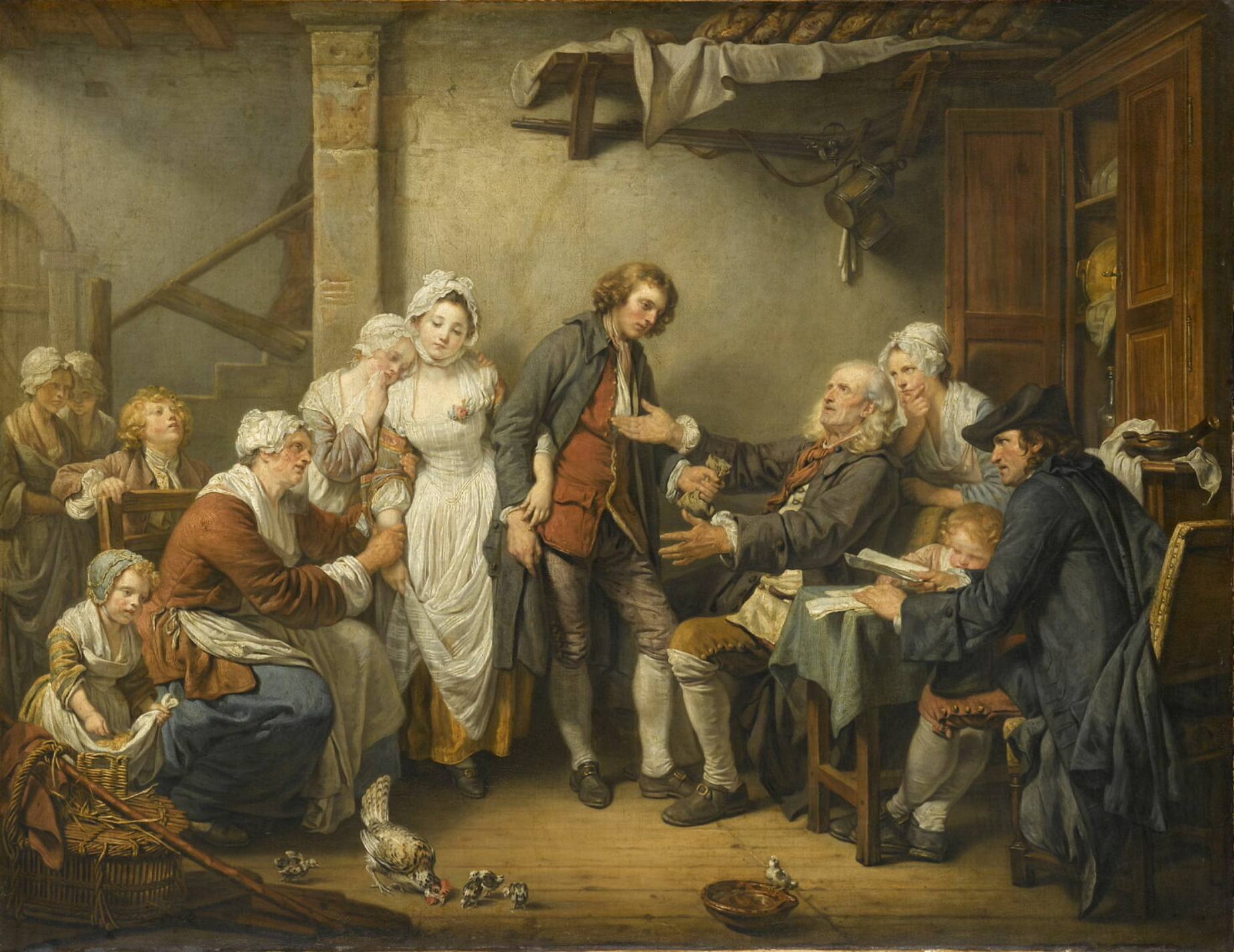
The Village Bride by Jean-Baptiste Greuze.

The Salon of 1761 was an art exhibition held at the Louvre in Paris. Staged during the reign of Louis XV and at a time when the Seven Years' War against Britain and Prussia was at its height, it reflected the taste of the Ancien régime during the mid-eighteenth century. The biennial Salon was organised by the Académie Royale. Jean Siméon Chardin was in charge of choosing hanging locations for the two hundred or so works on display. A number of submissions were Rococo in style. The art critic Denis Diderot wrote extensively about the Salon.

The exhibition was notable for the paintings of Jean-Baptiste Greuze who displayed fourteen works including The Laundress and The Village Bride. François Boucher submitted a pastoral work Shepherd and Shepherdess Reposing. The Swedish artist Alexander Roslin produced portraits both of Boucher and his wife Marie-Jeanne. Louis-Michel van Loo exhibited his Portrait of Louis XV, now a lost work but with several contemporary copies surviving. Joseph Vernet displayed two versions of View of Bayonne, part of his Views of the Ports of France series. Charles-André van Loo exhibited Mary Magdalene in the Desert and Jean-Baptiste-Henri Deshays's The Martyrdom of Saint Andrew, which were praised by Diderot.

Sculptures on display included Nymph Drying Her Hair by Louis-Claude Vassé, now in the Metropolitan Museum of Art. Jean-Baptiste Lemoyne exhibited a bust of Mademoiselle Clairon, an actress of the Comédie-Française. A total of thirty three painters, eleven engravers and nine sculptors took part in the Salon. It was followed by the Salon of 1763.

== Gallery ==
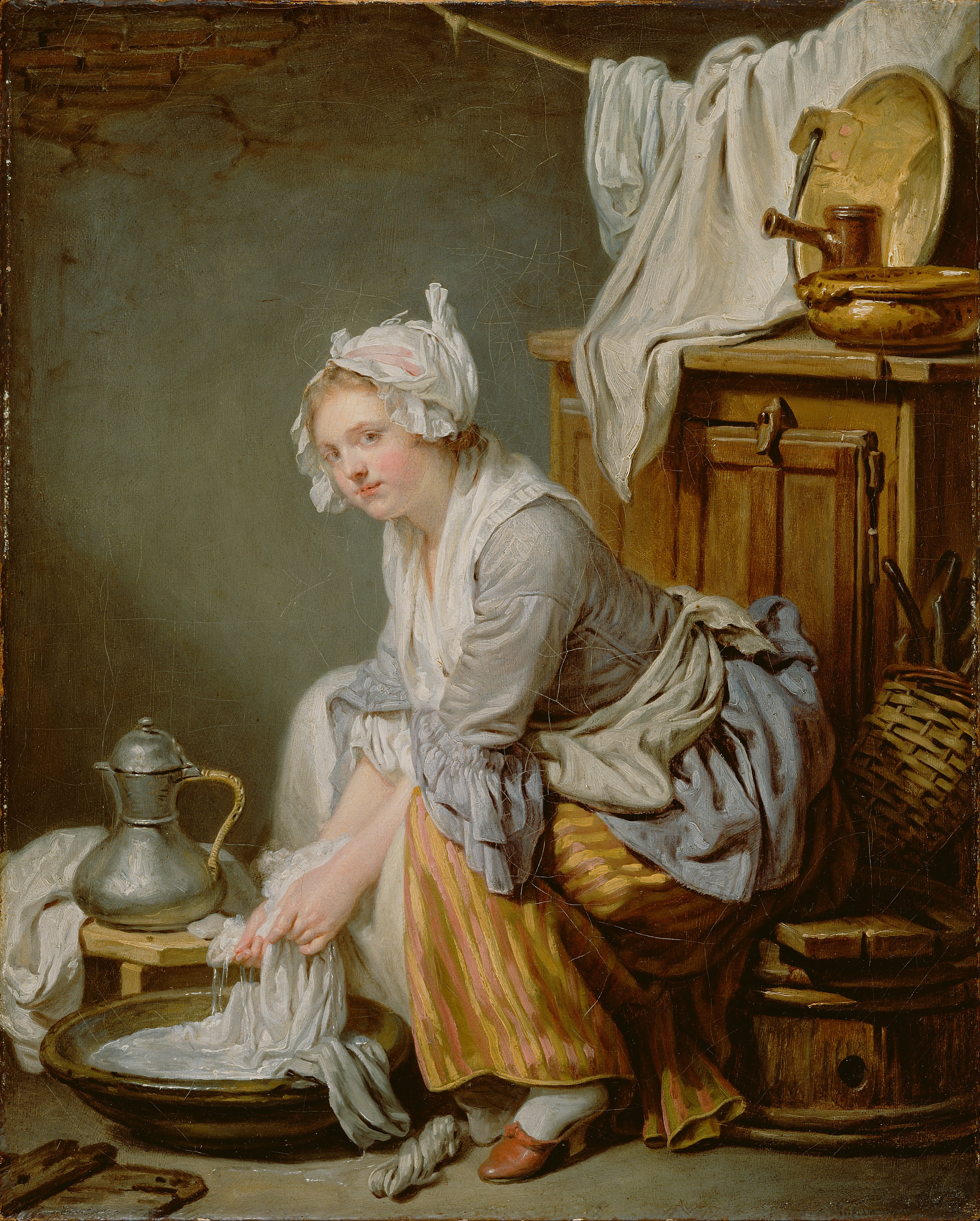
The Laundress by Jean-Baptiste Greuze

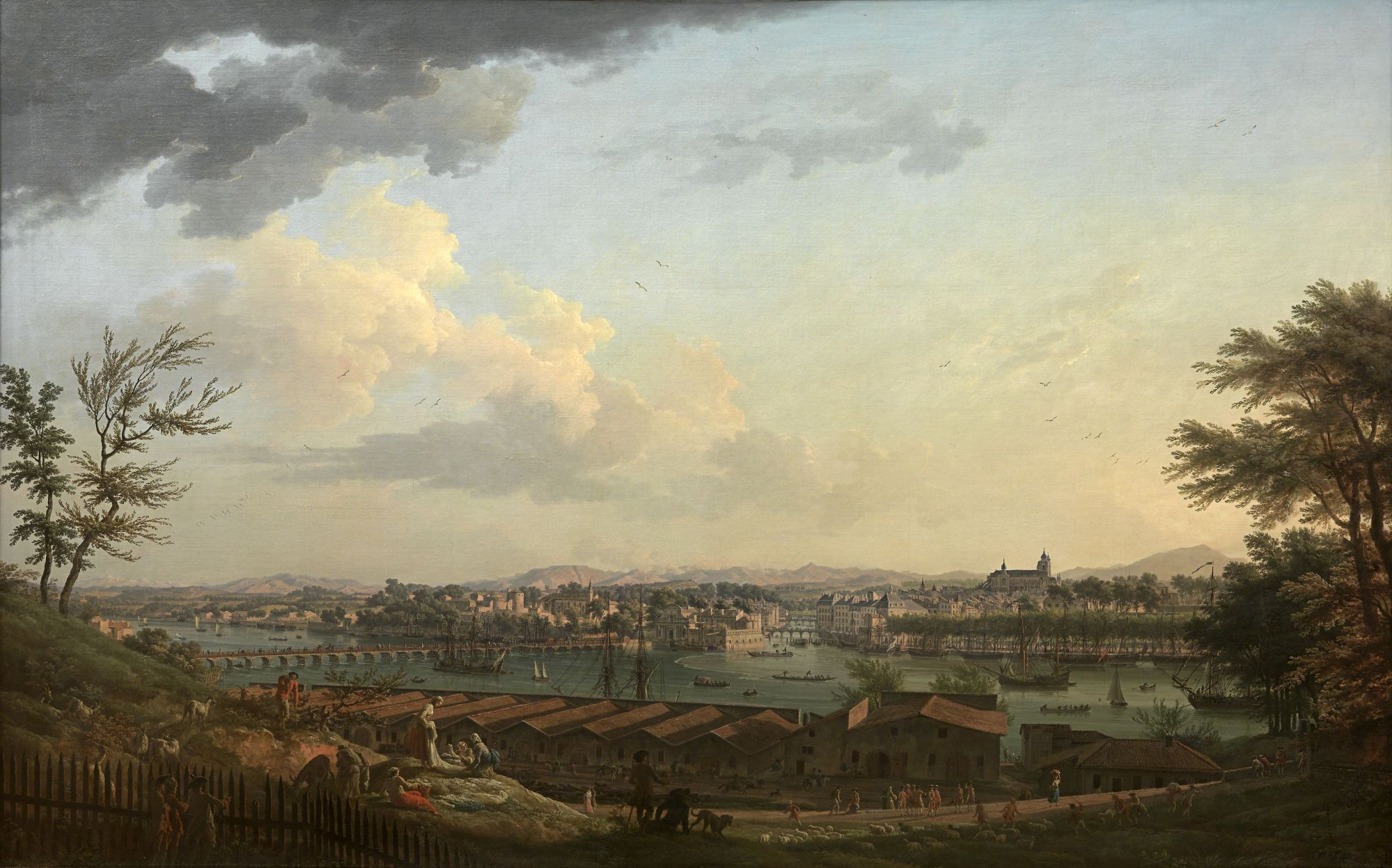
View of Bayonne by Claude-Joseph Vernet

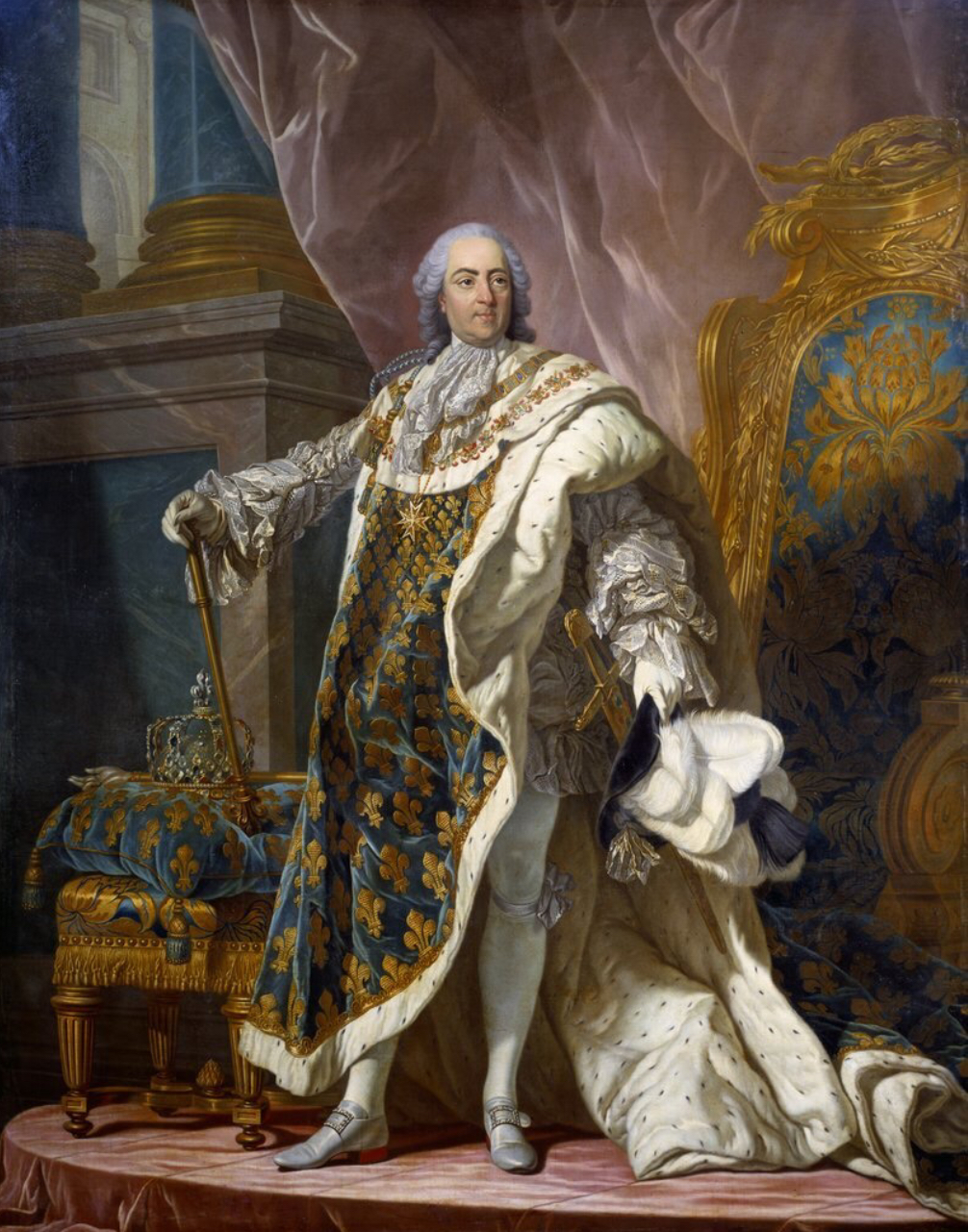
Portrait of Louis XV by Louis-Michel van Loo

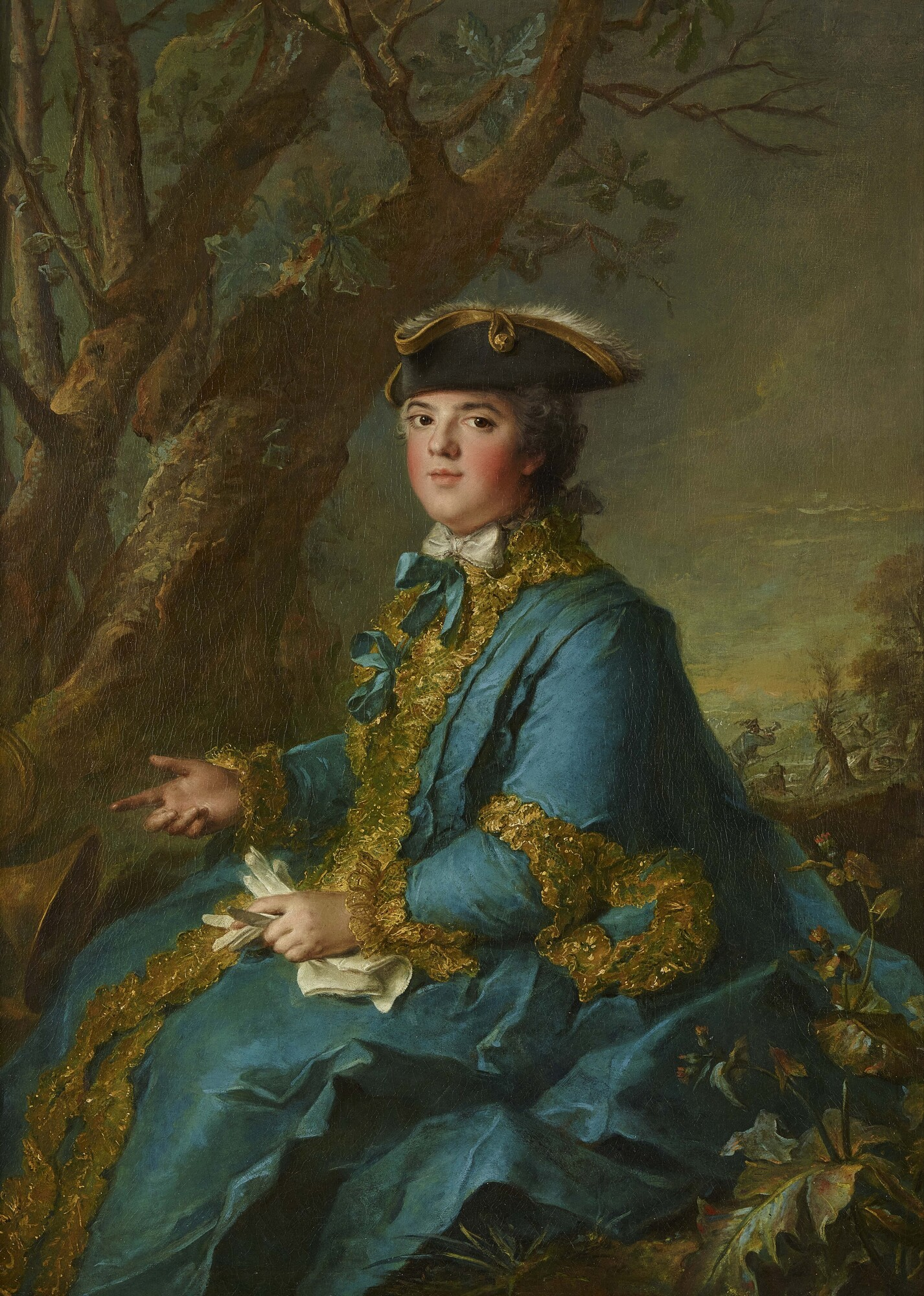
Portrait of Louise-Élisabeth of France by Jean-Marc Nattier

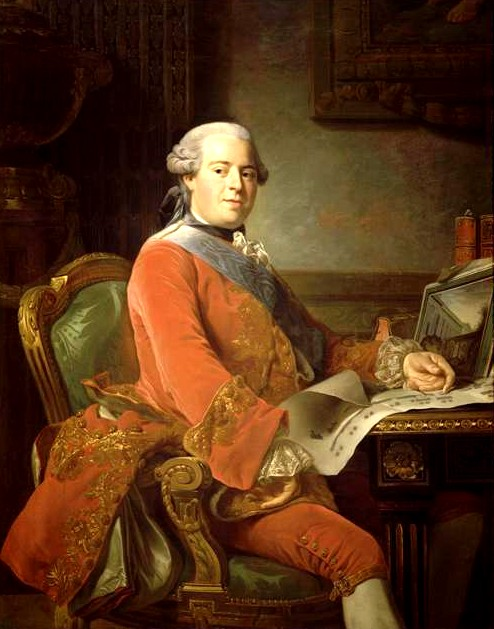
Portrait of the Marquis De Marigny by Alexander Roslin

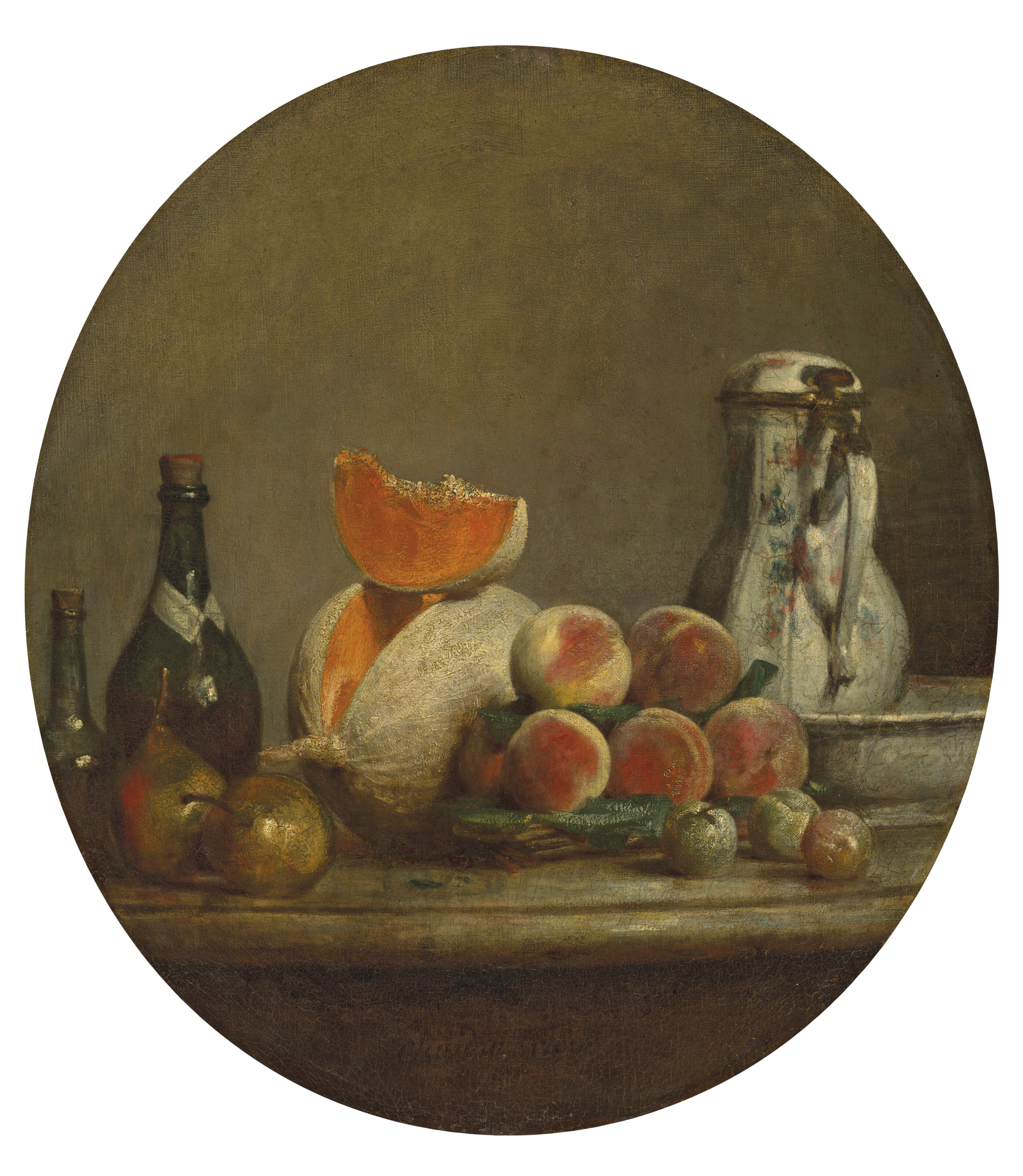
The Sliced Melon by Jean Siméon Chardin

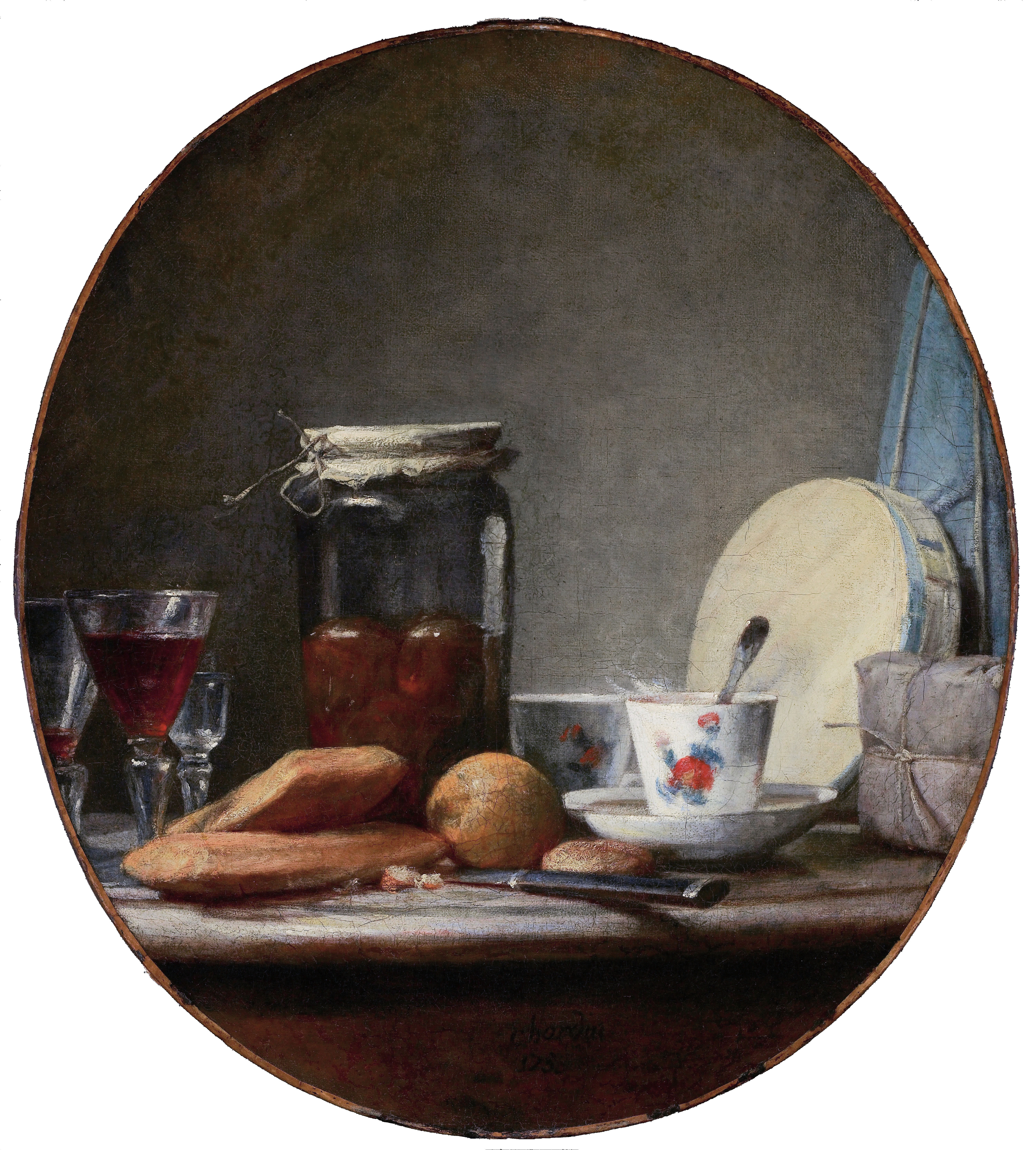
Jar of Apricots by Jean Siméon Chardin

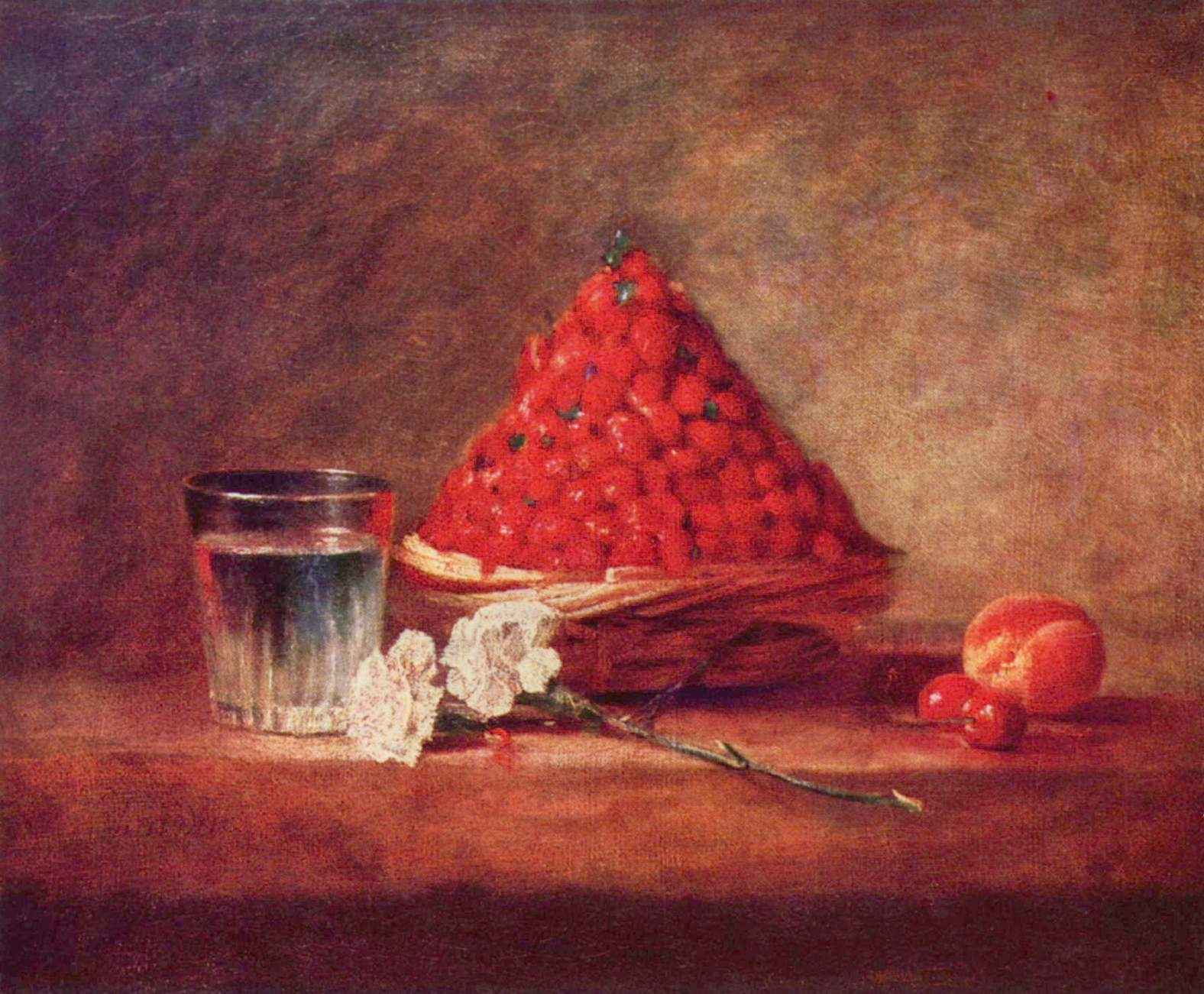
Basket of Wild Strawberries by Jean Siméon Chardin

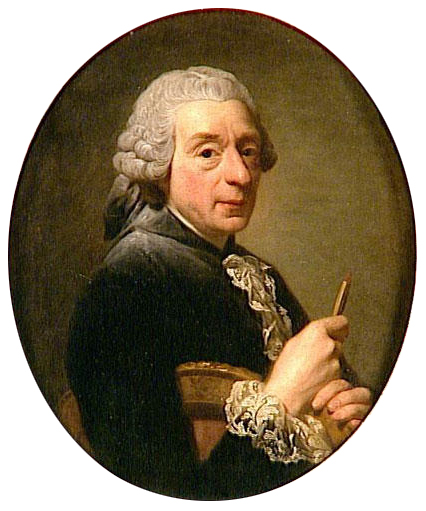
Portrait of François Boucher by Alexander Roslin

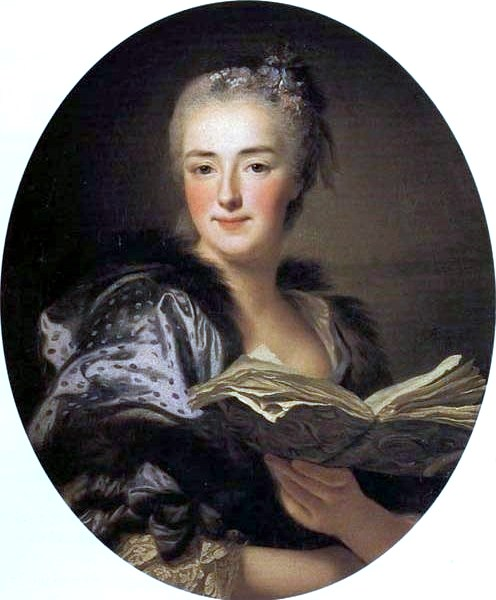
Portrait of Marie-Jeanne Boucher by Alexander Roslin

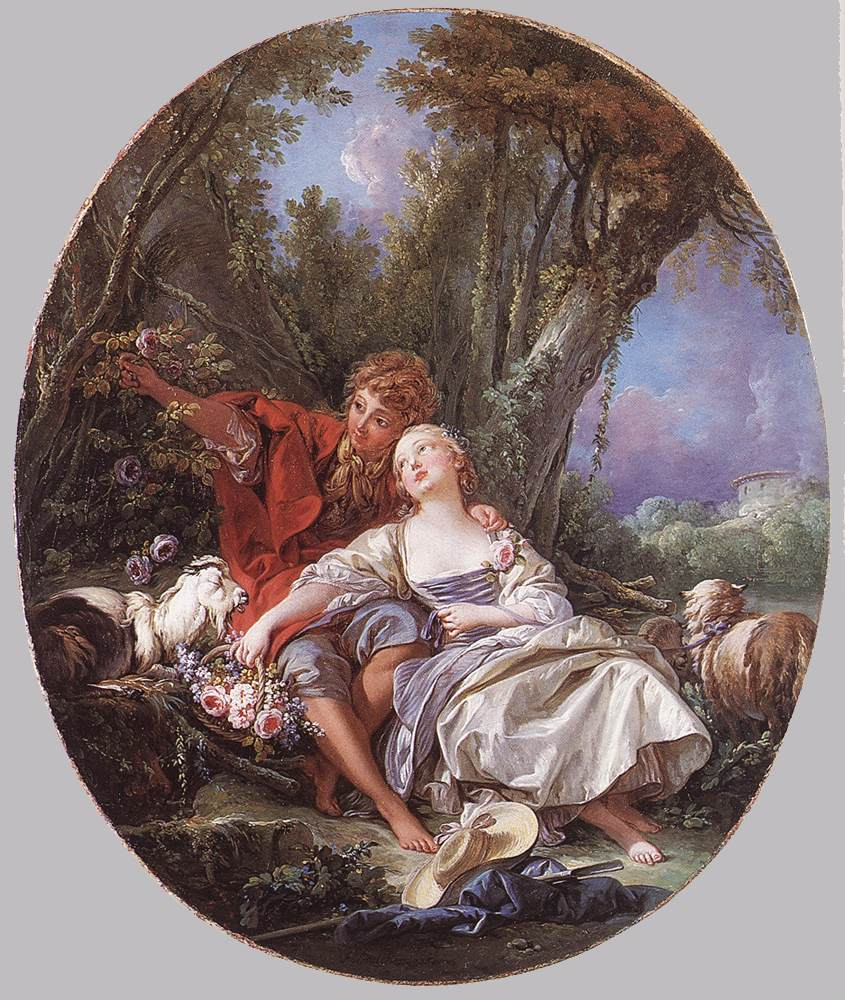
Shepherd and Shepherdess Reposing by François Boucher

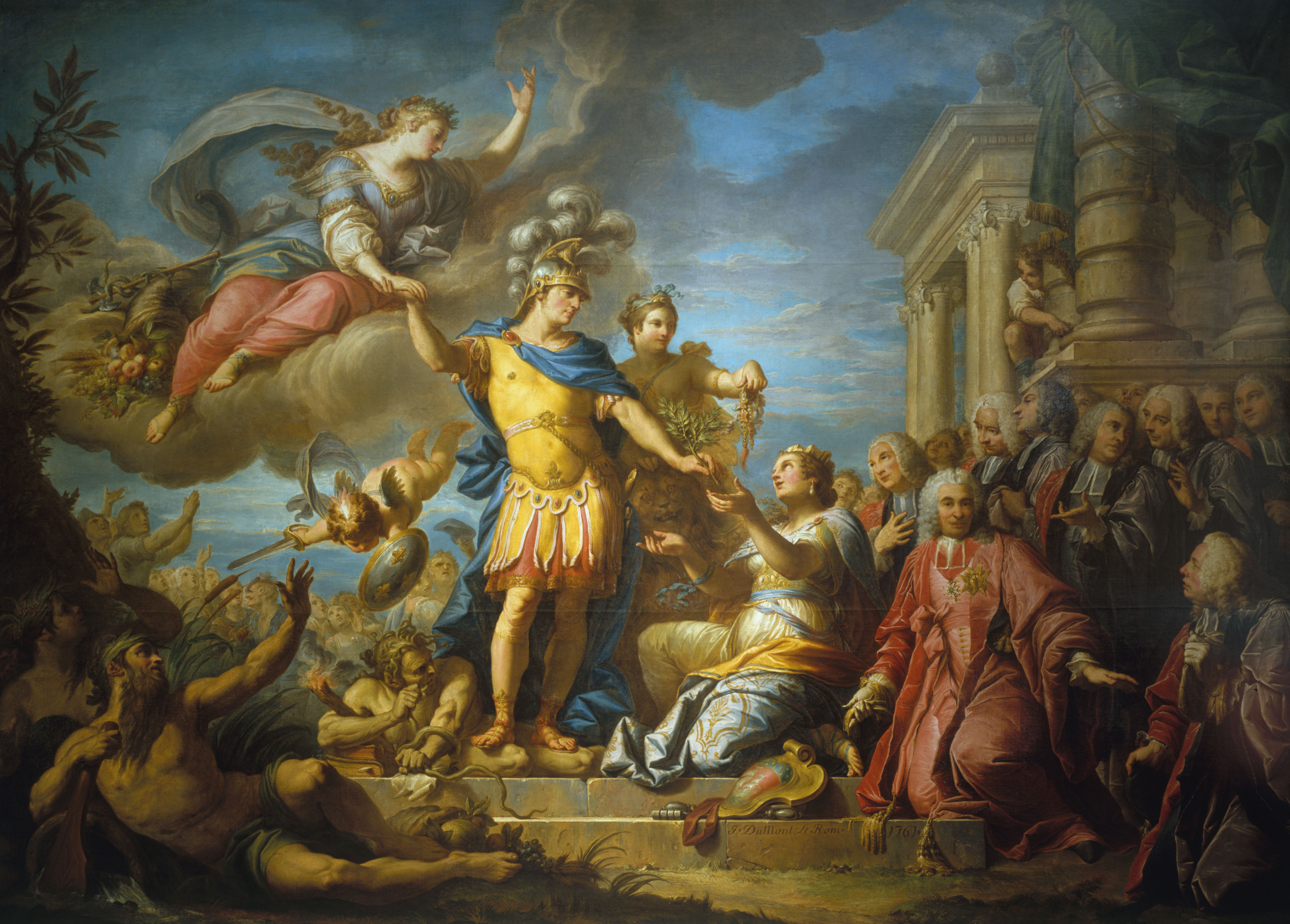
Allegory in Honour of the Publication of the Peace of Aix-la-Chapelle by Jacques Dumont le Romain

Le soleil couchant by Antoine Le Bel

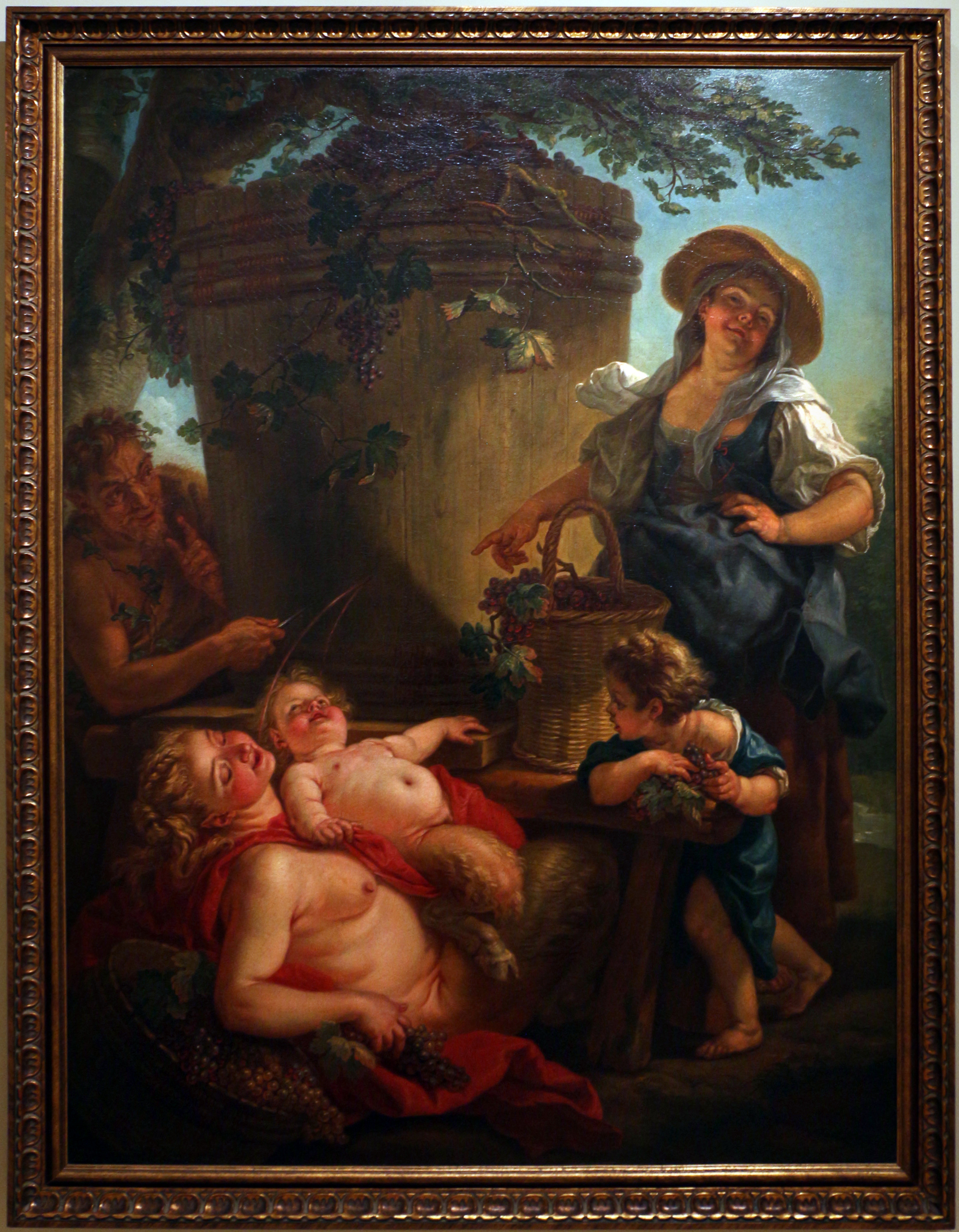
The Satyrs by Charles-Amédée-Philippe van Loo

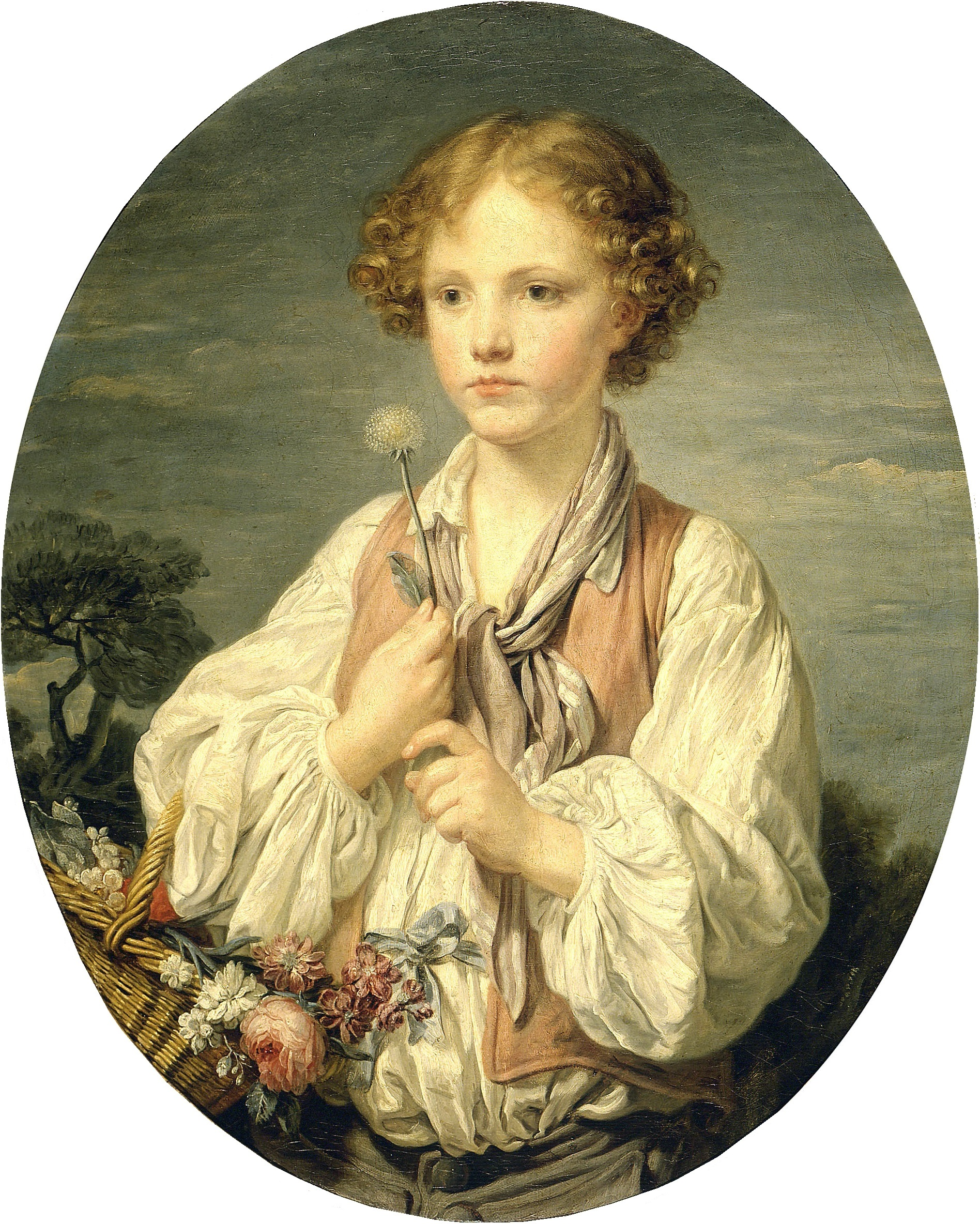
The Young Shepherd by Jean-Baptiste Greuze

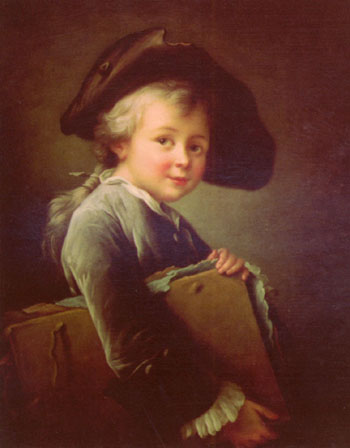
The Young Pupil by François-Hubert Drouais

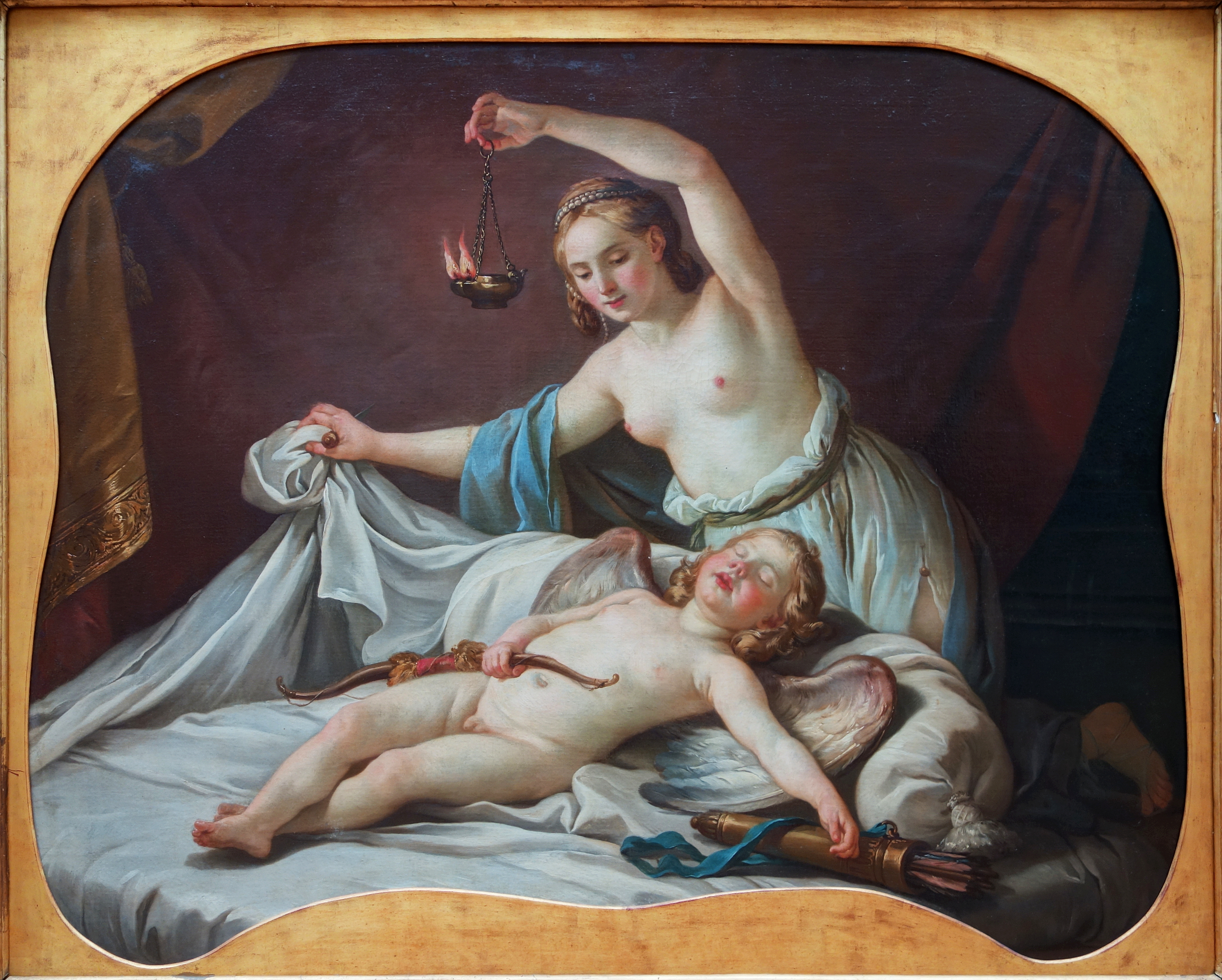
Psyche and Cupid by Joseph-Marie Vien

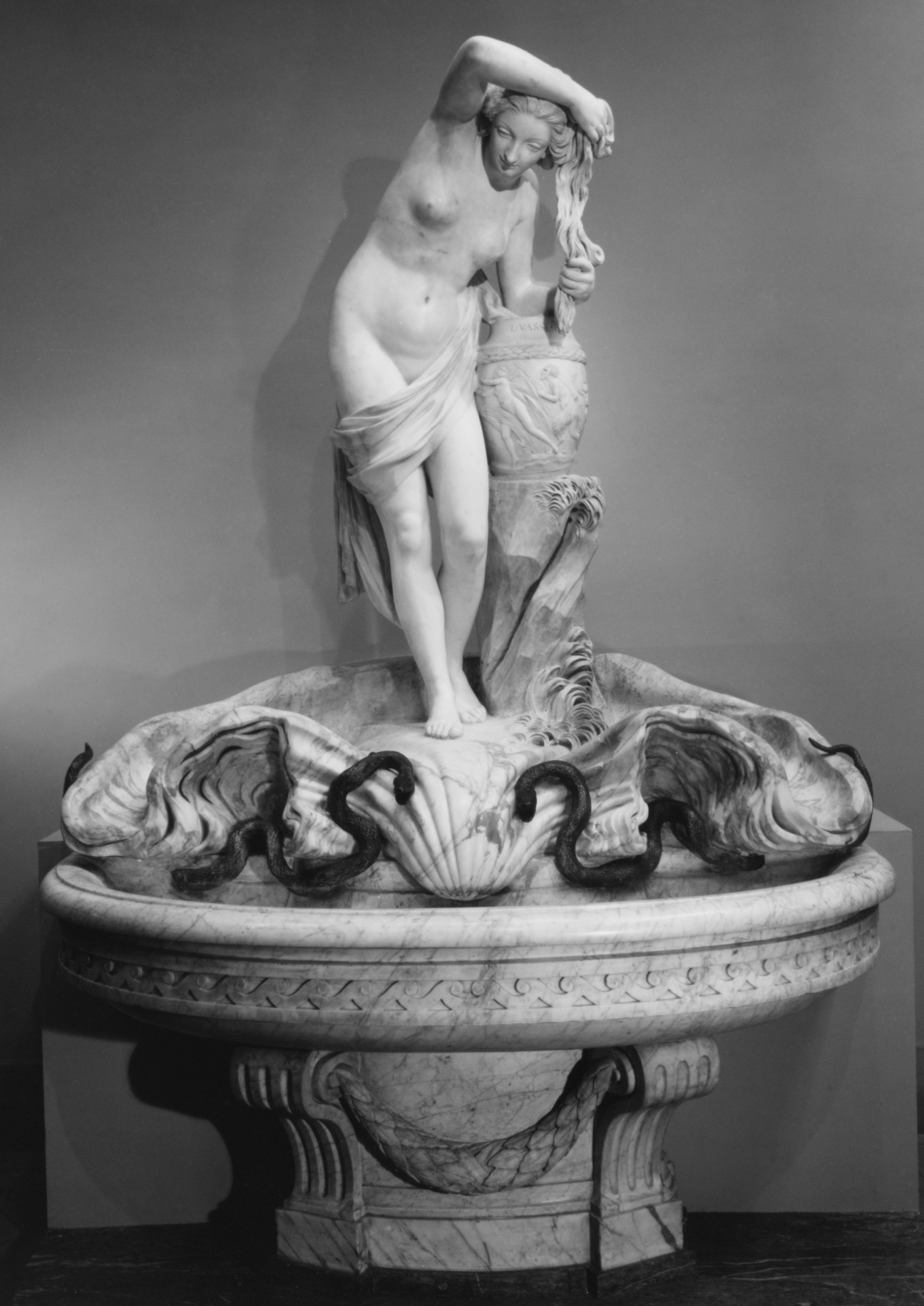
Nymph Drying Her Hair by Louis-Claude Vassé

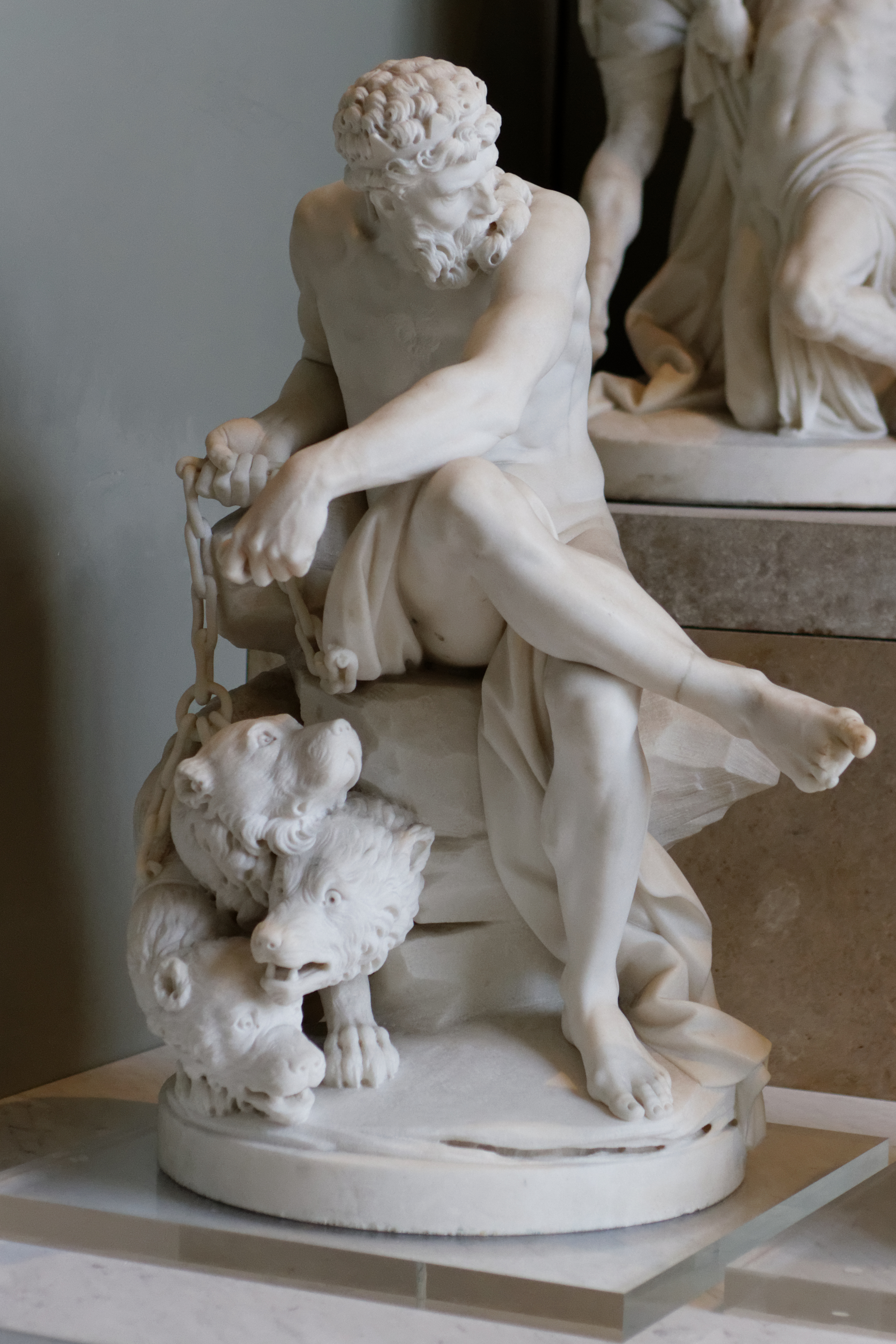
Pluton enchaînant Cerbère by Augustin Pajou

== See also ==
- Exhibition of 1761, a contemporaneous art exhibition held in London

== Bibliography ==
- Bailey, Colin B. Jean-Baptiste Greuze: The Laundress. Getty Publications, 2000.
- Levey, Michael. Painting and Sculpture in France, 1700–1789. Yale University Press, 1993.
- Rosenblum, Robert. Transformations in Late Eighteenth Century Art. Princeton University Press, 1970.
- Schechter, Ronald. A Genealogy of Terror in Eighteenth-Century France. University of Chicago Press, 2018.
