= Psyche Revived by Cupid's Kiss =

Sculpture in two versions by Antonio Canova

Psyché ranimée par le baiser de l'Amour, Louvre.jpg
- Amore e Psiche (Italian), Psyché ranimée par le baiser de l'Amour (French)
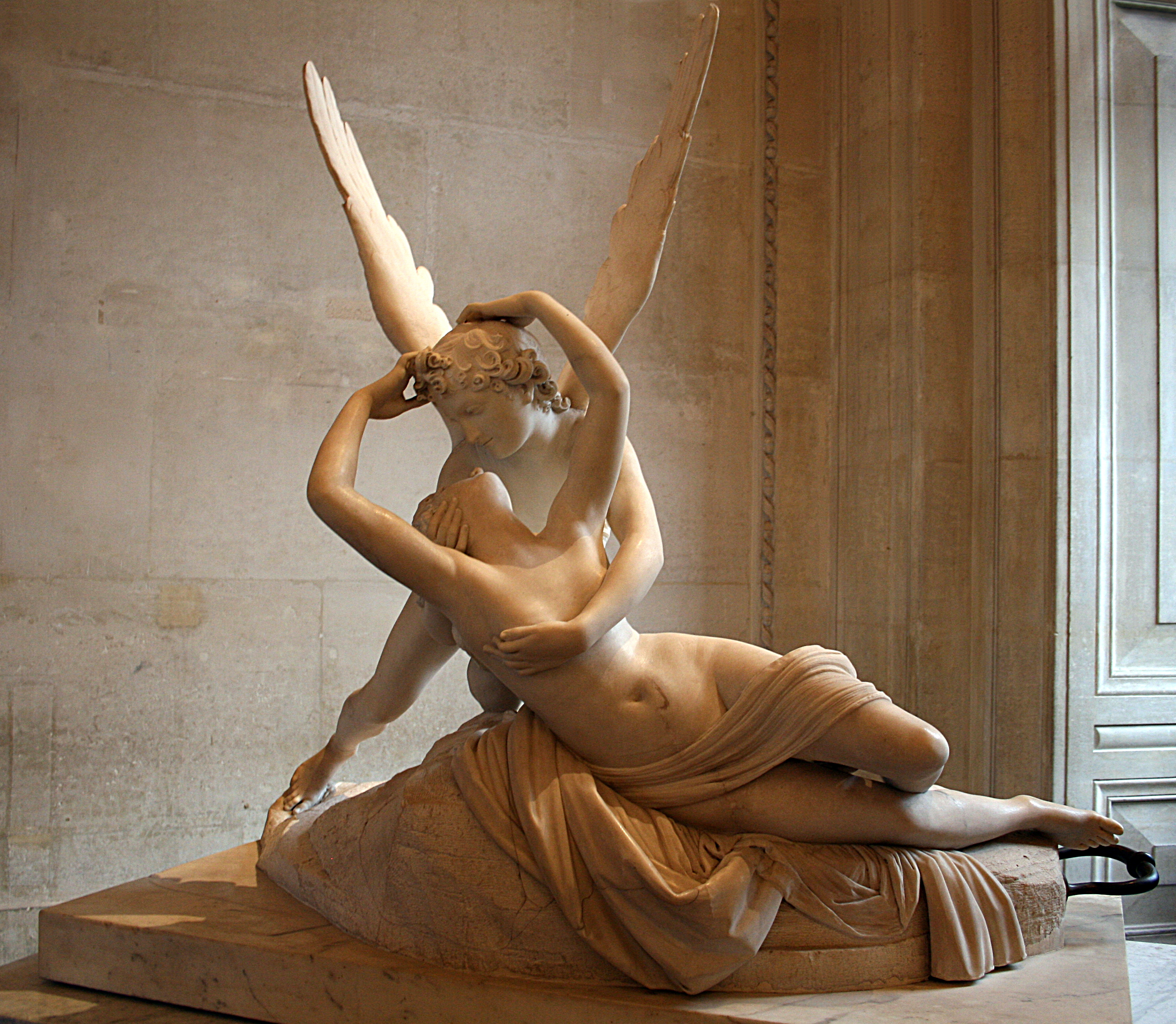
- First version, in the Louvre, Paris, France
- Artist: Antonio Canova
- Year: First version 1787–1793
- Type: Marble
- Dimensions: 155 cm × 168 cm (61 in × 66 in)
- Location: Louvre, Paris; Hermitage Museum, Saint Petersburg

Psyche Revived by Cupid's Kiss (Italian: Amore e Psiche [aˈmoːre e ˈpsiːke]; French: Psyché ranimée par le baiser de l'Amour; Slovene: Amor in Psihe; Russian: Амур и Психея, romanized: Amúr i Psikhéya) is a sculpture by Italian artist Antonio Canova first commissioned in 1787 by Colonel John Campbell. It is regarded as a masterpiece of Neoclassical sculpture, but shows the mythological lovers at a moment of great emotion, characteristic of the emerging movement of Romanticism. It represents the god Cupid in the height of love and tenderness, immediately after awakening the lifeless Psyche with a kiss. The story of Cupid and Psyche is taken from Lucius Apuleius' Latin novel The Golden Ass, and was popular as a theme in art.

Joachim Murat acquired the first or prime version (pictured) in 1800. After his death, the statue entered the Louvre Museum in Paris, France in 1824; Prince Yusupov, a Russian nobleman acquired the second version of the piece from Canova in Rome in 1796, and it later entered the Hermitage Museum in Saint Petersburg. A full-scale model for the second version is in the Metropolitan Museum of Art.

== Description ==
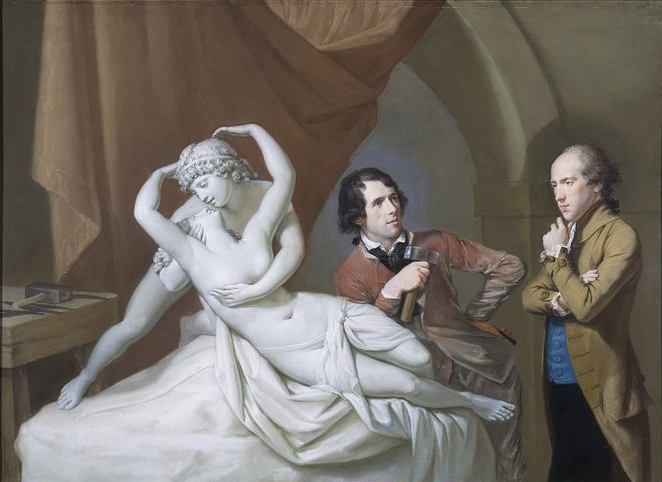
Antonio Canova in his studio with Henry Tresham and a plaster model for Cupid and Psyche by Hugh Douglas Hamilton, c. 1788–1791

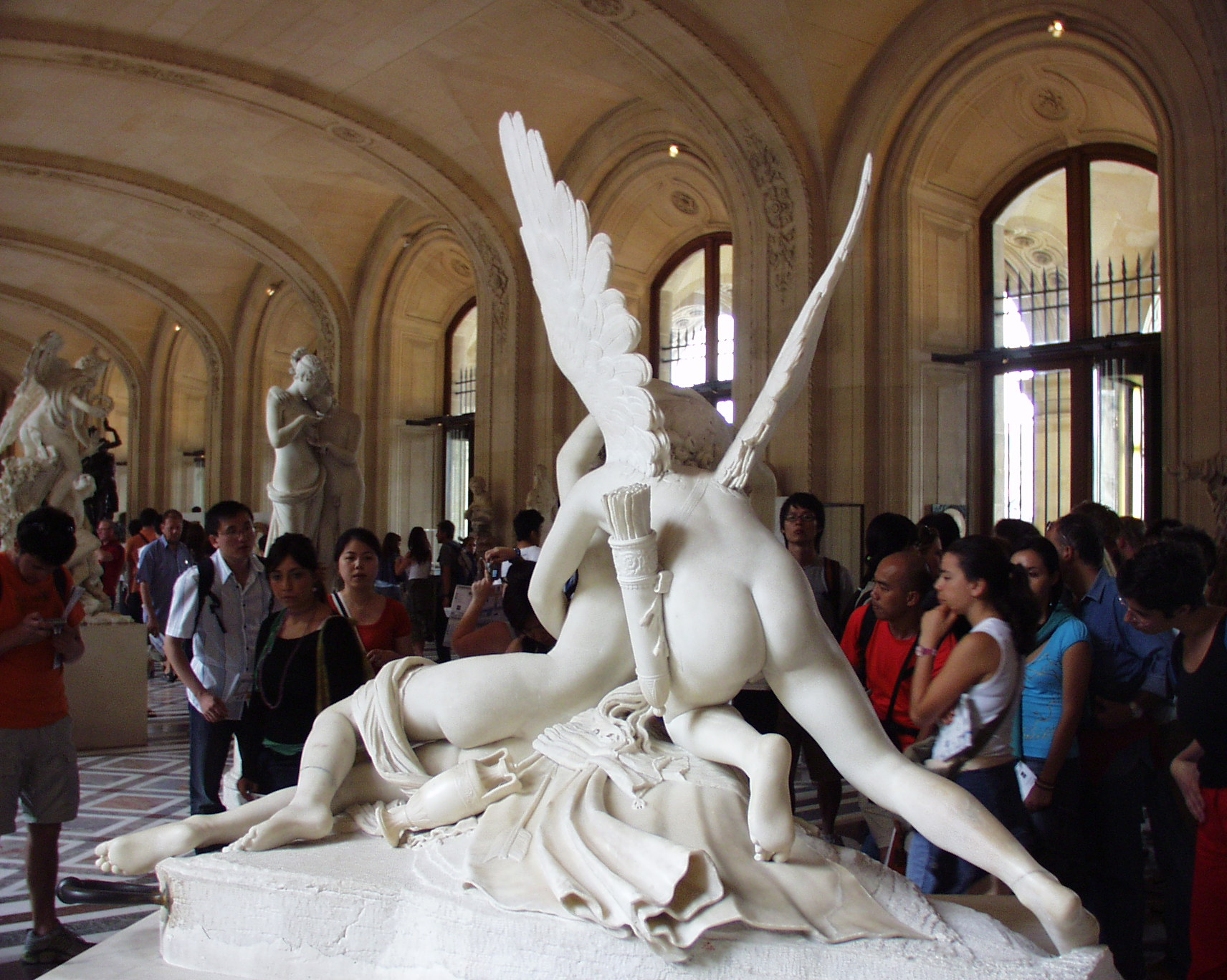
Alternative view from behind showing Cupid's arrows and the flask Psyche brought from the underworld, Louvre

Having been recently awakened, Psyche reaches up toward her lover, Cupid, as he gently holds her by supporting her head and breast. Antonio Canova's fine technique in carving marble contrasts their realistic smooth skin with the surrounding elements. Loosely draped around Psyche's lower body, a sheet further emphasizes the difference between the texture of skin and drapery. Rough texture provides the basis of the rock upon which the composition is placed supplementing the distinctions of elements. Fine curls and lines make up the hair and light feathery details create realistic wings upon the landing Cupid.

In Apuleius, Psyche had been warned by Venus against opening the jar she was given to collect a scrap of beauty from Proserpina for Venus: "But I give you one especially strong warning. Do not open or peep into the [jar] you carry, and repress all curiosity as to the 'Imprisoned Treasure of Divine Beauty'." But she gave way to curiosity just as she had returned from her voyage into the Underworld, peering into the jar to take some of the Divine Beauty for herself. However, Proserpina had not filled it with the Beauty, but rather with the "Sleep of the Innermost Darkness, the night of Styx, which freed from its cell rushed upon her and penetrated her whole body with a heavy cloud of unconsciousness and unfolded her where she lay." It is the moment in which Psyche is "a corpse asleep" revived by Cupid that Canova chose to depict. "Delicately purging her of the Sleep, which he put back in its original lair the [jar], he roused Psyche with a charming prick of his Arrow." Various details such as the jar behind Psyche allude to the story by Apuleius; Psyche had opened it and gone to sleep immediately, thus the jar remains lying beside her. Additionally, the arrow which Cupid struck Psyche with to awaken her is also found near the jar, and Cupid wears a quiver next to his waist.

Cupid and Psyche by Antonio Canova, Detail

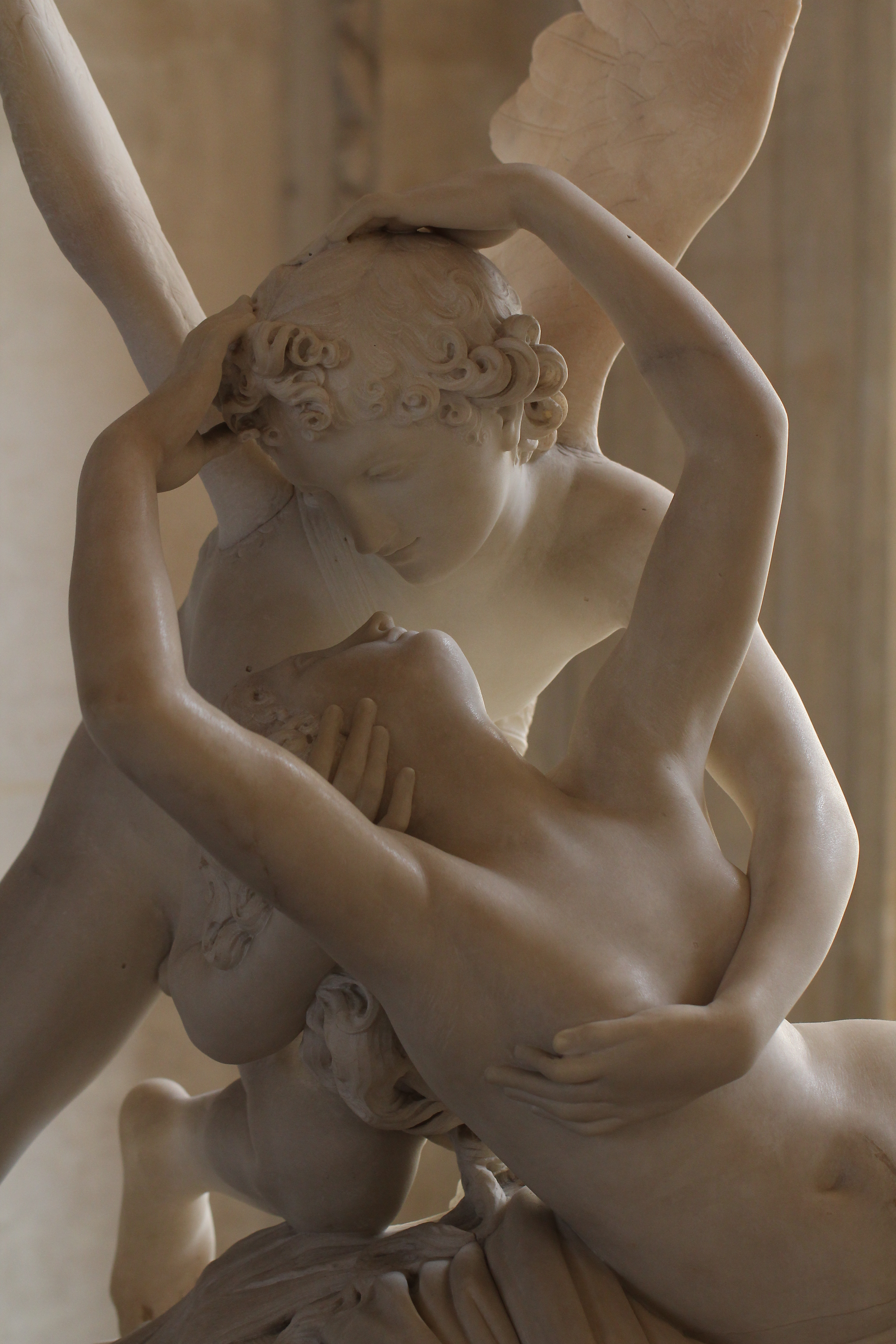

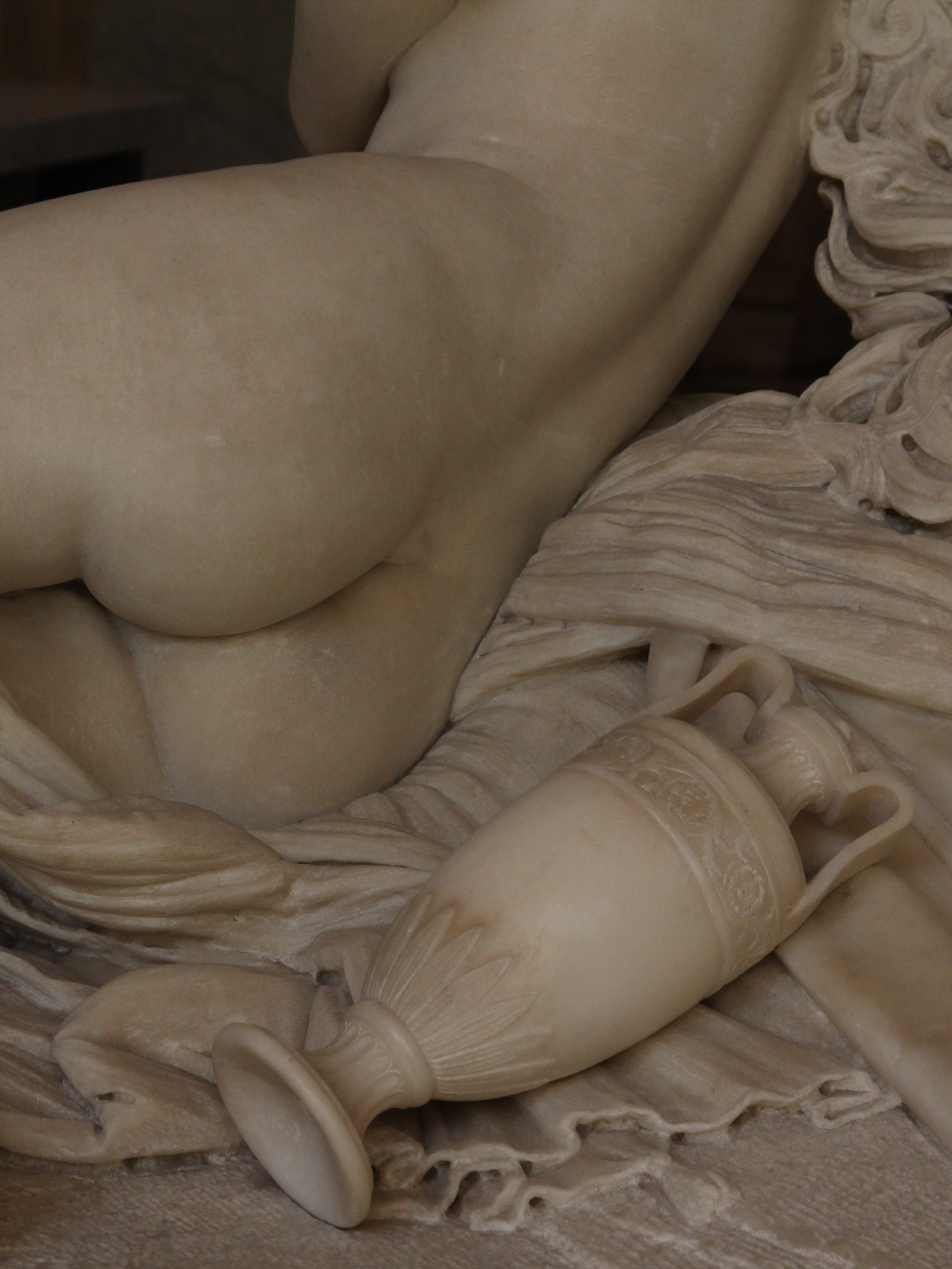

== Criticism ==
There is a handle near one of Psyche's feet as the statue was meant to be able to be revolved on its base. Many of Canova's sculptures had custom built settings or a device that would move the base, thus the handle provided for some of the movement of the statue. This movement emphasizes the emotion and beauty of the sculpture while piquing interest from all angles. Carl Ludwig Fernow, a critic of Canova, complained about the vitality of the embracing figures as there is no singular view from which it should be seen. He stated, "you must run around it, look at it from high and low, up and down, look at it again and keep getting lost". Fernow continued that one's view must have a singular fixed point without the entire piece striking the viewer. Fernow's criticism of Canova's work is a complaint of having to view the sculpture by walking around it rather than from one perspective. Fernow continues, "this effort is somewhat mitigated, for the group perches on a pedestal and can be walked around at will; but the observer strives in vain to find a point of view from which to see both faces together, and in which to reduce each ray of tender expression to one central point of convergence."

== Canova ==
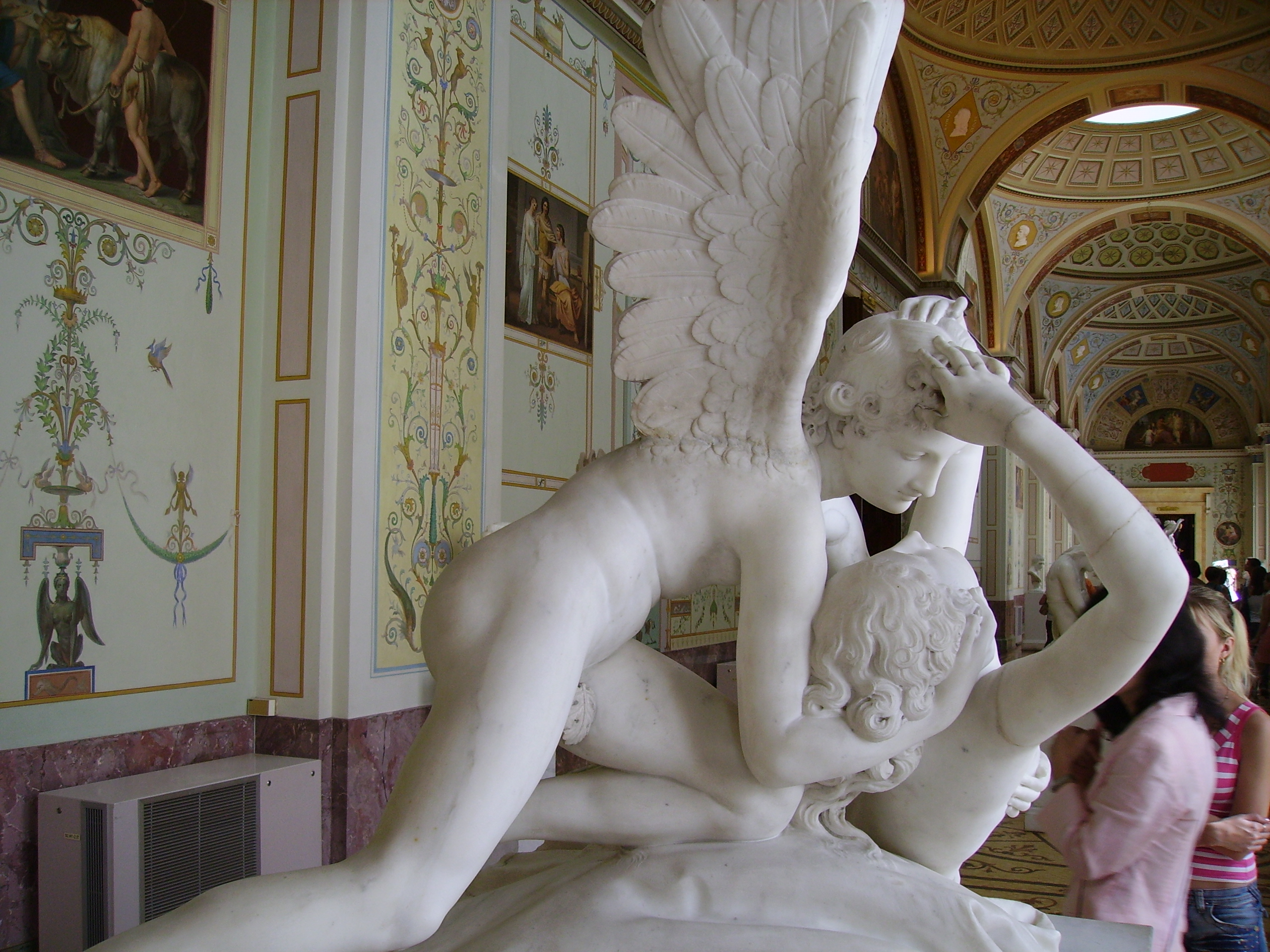
Alternative view from side showing detail on Cupid's wings, Hermitage version

The sculptor was born in 1757 in Possagno, Republic of Venice, and was raised by his stonemason paternal grandfather, Pasino Canova. Venetian Senator Giovanni Falier was Canova's patron with great influence which started Canova's career. During Napoleon Bonaparte's campaigns of 1796–97, Napoleon caught wind of Canova's sculpture; "General Bonaparte offered Canova his protection and greatly flattered the sculptor, and later, when he was military dictator of France as first consul, he sought to enlist Canova's considerable talents for his own glorification." Canova however, deemed himself an independent artist and had previously rejected a court invitation from Czarina Catherine II, as Canova believed, "art was above politics". Yet this was not enough as "in the end power politics, manifested in French pressure on the papacy, forced [Canova] to acquiesce." Against his wishes, Canova gained various titles and honors such as "Cavaliere of the Golden Spur, Cavaliere di Cristo, [and] marquisate of Ischia". Canova was a wildly successful independent sculptor and his skill and talent is evident within his works such as Psyche Revived by Cupid's Kiss.

== See also ==
- Cupid and Psyche
