= Marie-Jeanne Boucher =

French painter and engraver (1716–1796)

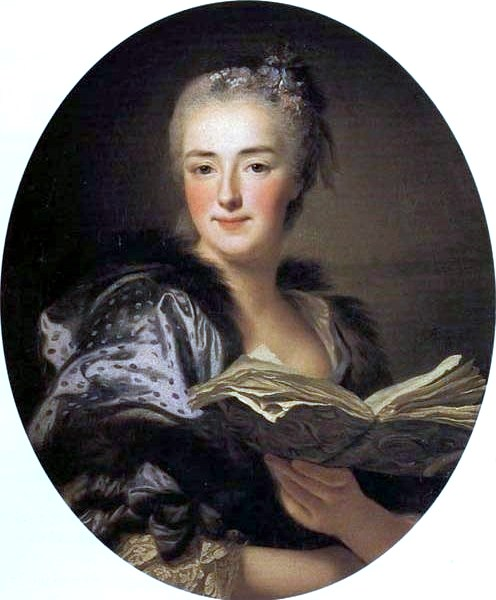
- Born: Marie-Jeanne Buzeau; 9 January 1716; Paris
- Died: 30 December 1796 (aged 80); Paris
- Citizenship: France
- Occupations: Painter; Engraver
- Movement: Rococo
- Spouse: François Boucher

Marie-Jeanne Boucher was a French painter and engraver. She was baptized on 9 January 1716, in the parish of Saint-Nicolas des Champs.

She was married to François Boucher and several of her works have been attributed to her husband.

She died on Friday 30 December 1796 in her home on the rue de l'Égalité.
