= Prime version =

First iteration of an artwork

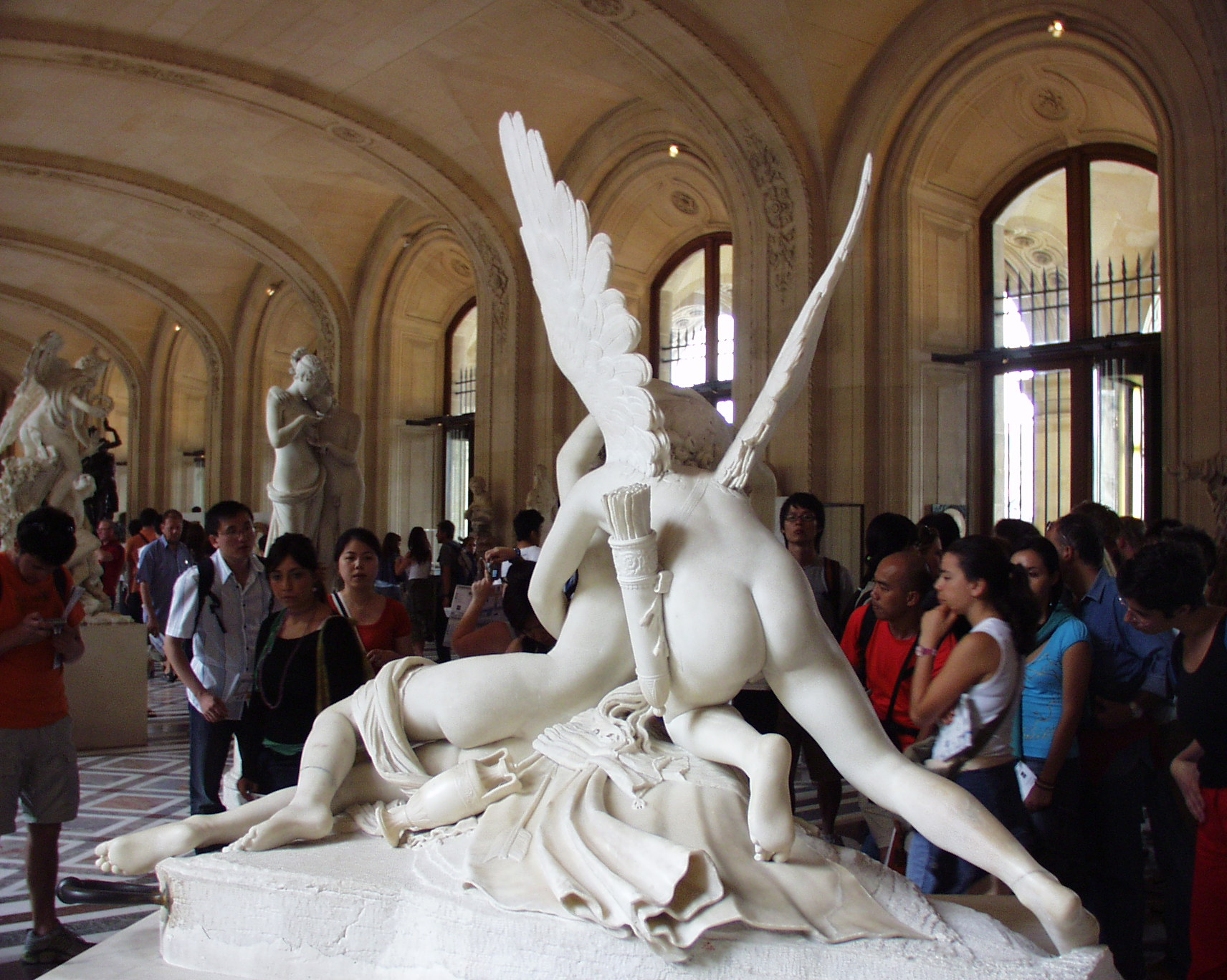
Rear view of the Louvre's prime version of Antonio Canova's Psyche Revived by Cupid's Kiss, 1793

In the art world, if an artwork exists in several versions, the one known or believed to be the earliest is called the prime version. Many artworks produced in media such as painting or carved sculpture which create unique objects are in fact repeated by their artists, often several times. It is regarded as a matter of some importance both by art historians and the art market to establish which version has "priority", that is to say was the original work. The presumption usually is that the prime version is the finest, and perhaps the most carefully done, though some later versions can be argued to improve on the originals.

In many periods the later "repetitions" were often produced by the workshop of the master, with varying degrees of supervision and direct attention from him. This was especially the case with official portraits of monarchs and politicians, which in the Early Modern period were often ordered in large numbers of versions from the court artist as diplomatic gifts. "Prime version" is normally only used when there is another version by the same artist, or his workshop. Other versions by other artists are called copies. Sometimes "reduced versions" that are considerably smaller than the prime one are made. Especially in the case of 19th-century repetitions, the term autograph replica is used of repetitions by the original artist.

== Contexts ==
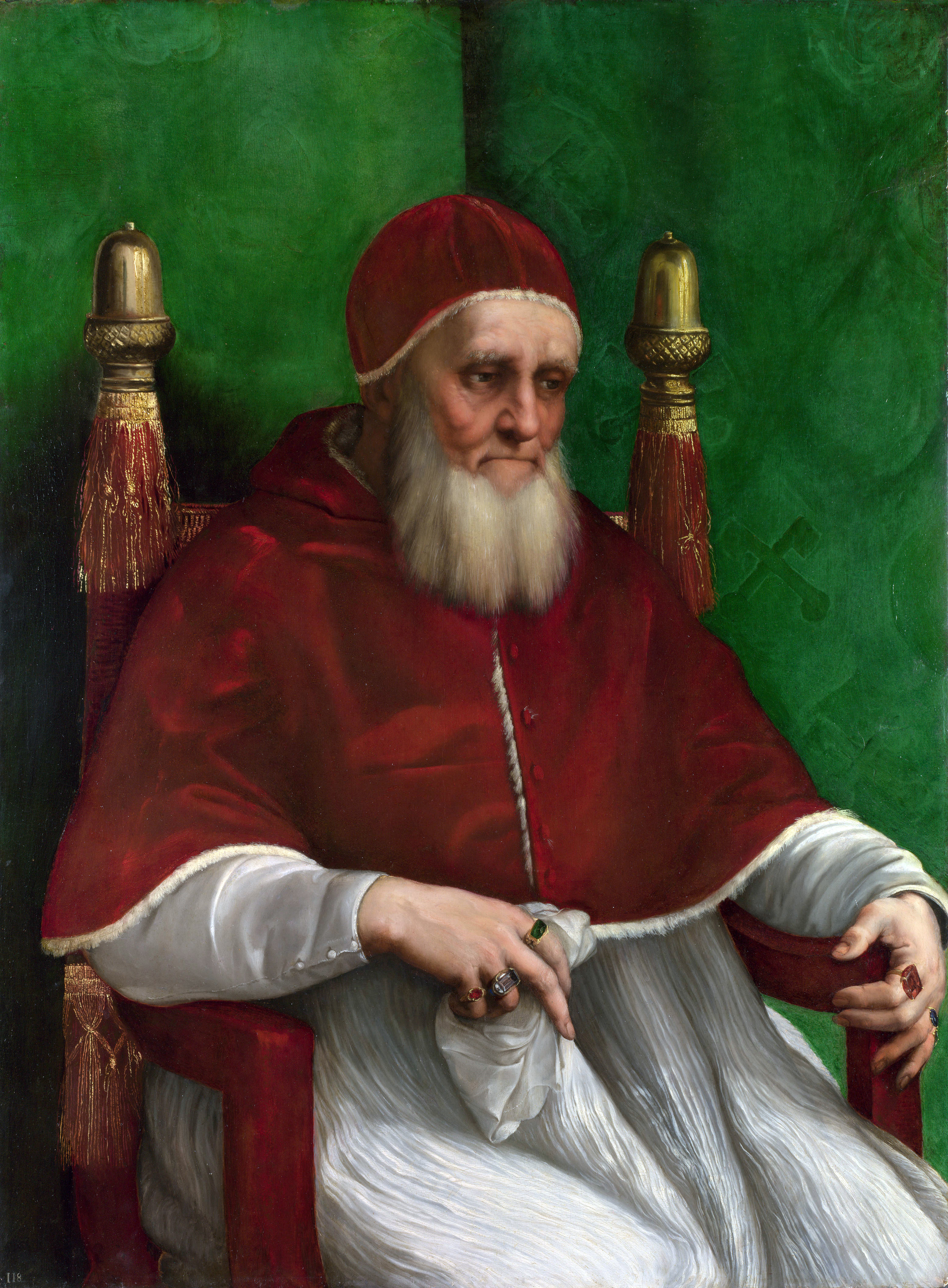
The London version of Portrait of Pope Julius II by Raphael, 1511–12, recognized since 1970 as the prime version

In the case of official portraits the later creation of replica versions was likely to have been anticipated from the start, as in other types of art such as printmaking, but in other types of painting, especially history painting, the normal presumption, in the past as today, was that each work was a unique creation. This was a matter of some importance to the owner, and there was evidently in some periods a general understanding that a work should not be replicated or copied without the permission of the owner of the prime version, which needed to be asked for carefully and was not always given. In many periods "replicas were the direct product of collecting, as collectors have always preferred recognizable masterpieces to what is offbeat".

This was true of 17th century Rome, where artists such as Orazio Gentileschi and Bernardo Strozzi routinely made replicas, and others such as Guercino and Guido Reni sometimes did, as of Victorian London, where artists such as William Powell Frith often painted one or more replica versions of their successes. In Frith's case the replicas were painted many years after his first versions, when his newer work was achieving less success. The French painter Charles Landelle recorded no fewer than 32 versions of his Femme Fellah, an Orientalist hit at the Paris Salon of 1866. Pieces of sculpture made by casting processes that allow the original model to be reproduced several times are rather different; though the first in an edition (today often kept by the artist) has some added prestige, it is expected that a number of versions will be made. Especially in the 19th century, carved marble sculptures were very often made mechanically using pointing machines following a clay or plaster modello by the artist, and further versions were produced as commissions came in.

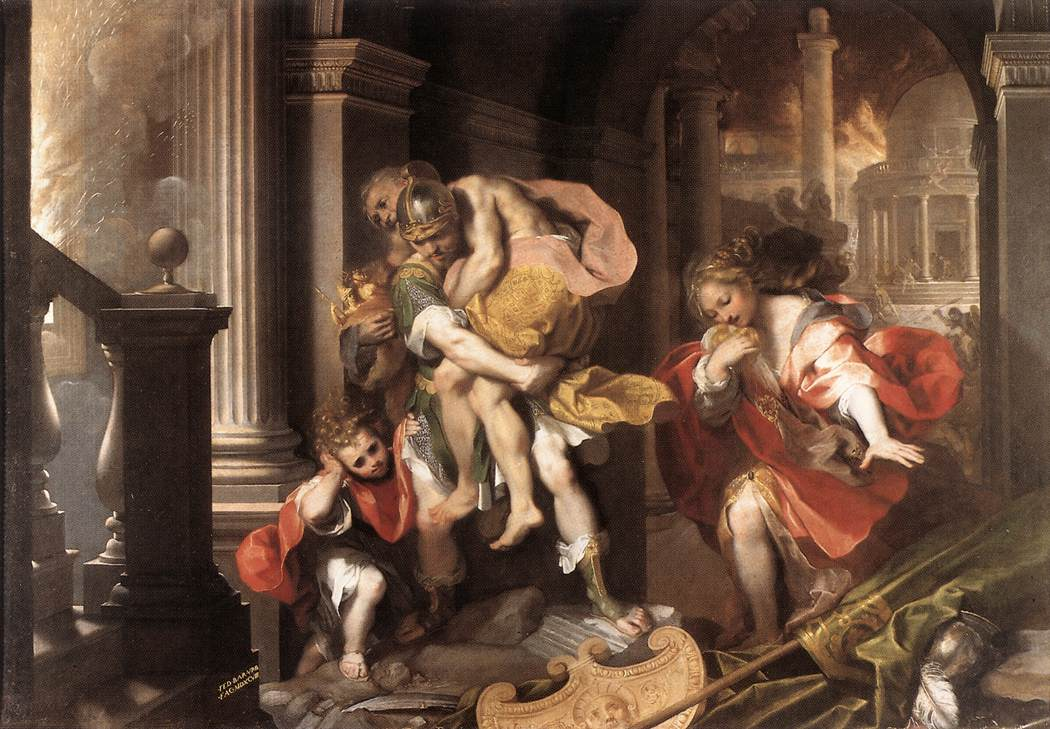
Aeneas' Flight from Troy by Federico Barocci, image of the replica version in Rome.

An example of a work now only known from a replica (in the Galleria Borghese in Rome) and studies is Aeneas and his Family Fleeing Troy, the only secular history painting by Federico Barocci. The prime version was given in 1586 by Francesco Maria II, the last Duke of Urbino, to Rudolph II, Holy Roman Emperor in Prague, and was later looted by the Swedes. It was taken to Rome by Queen Christina of Sweden, passed to the Orleans collection in Paris, and finally sold at auction in London for 14 guineas in 1800 (the price probably reflecting the poor condition some sources mention), since when its whereabouts are unknown. The Rome version was painted in 1598, presumably for Cardinal Scipio Borghese.

== Judging the prime version ==
In some cases it is evident which version of a work is prime, especially if there is a full provenance including a contract or other documentation of the original commission; a contract for a copy will normally make that clear. Otherwise experts will look both at the overall quality of the work, and also technical elements such as detailed underdrawing and pentimenti (changes of mind) that indicate that the artist was finalizing his idea of the work as he proceeded. Infrared and X-ray photography are among the scientific techniques that may help in discovering these technical issues. Close comparison with the evolving style of other works by the artist and the comparison, ideally physically side by side, between two rival versions will often lead to a clear conclusion, but sometimes arguments between experts may take decades to reach a conclusion, as with other issues of attribution.

One of the most dramatic reassessments in recent decades, of a very important work, came in 1970 when a new assessment of a version of the Portrait of Pope Julius II by Raphael drew on a combination of new scientific research and archival knowledge, as x-rays revealed an inventory number from 1693, as well as a background that Raphael had repainted. The version in the Uffizi Gallery in Florence, previously considered prime, was replaced by the version in the National Gallery, London, previously considered a replica.

== Examples ==
- Leonardo da Vinci, Virgin of the Rocks; prime Louvre, second version National Gallery, London
- Jean-Baptiste Greuze, The Laundress, 1761, prime J. Paul Getty Museum, second version Fogg Museum
- Antonio Canova, Psyche Revived by Cupid's Kiss; prime Louvre (completed 1793), other versions Hermitage Museum (1796) and elsewhere. An example of a relatively recent work where documentary evidence means that the prime version has never been in dispute.
- William Powell Frith, The Derby Day; prime (1858) Tate Britain, second version (1893–94) Manchester City Art Gallery, plus a much smaller but highly finished "original study", sold at Christie's for £505,250 in December 2011.
- Ary Scheffer, Francesca da Rimini and Paolo Malatesta Appraised by Dante and Virgil (and variant titles). Probably his best-known work; over 15 years after the original he produced several smaller versions. The prime version, from 1835, measures 166.5 by 234 centimetres (65.6 by 92.1 in); now Wallace Collection in London. The second version (1854), measuring 51.7 by 81.3 centimetres (20.4 by 32.0 in), is in the Hamburger Kunsthalle. The third version (1855) is now in the Louvre. Another version from 1851 measuring 24.7 by 33.2 centimetres (9.7 by 13.1 in) is in the Cleveland Museum of Art, Ohio. The Carnegie Museum of Art in Pittsburgh has another version.
- The famous Ancient Egyptian Nefertiti Bust in Berlin is thought to be a finished modello, largely in plaster, for studio use in making other official portraits.
- The Greek Slave, by the American sculptor Hiram Powers, was produced in six marble versions (typically for the period, all carved by assistants from the artist's plaster modello), and further reduced versions.

== See also ==
- Manuscript
- Negative (photography)
