= 1763 in art =

Events from the year 1763 in art.

== Events ==
- In Venice
  - Canaletto and Francesco Zuccarelli are elected to the Accademia di Belle Arti di Venezia.
  - Francesco Guardi begins painting the 12 Doge's Feasts series.

== Paintings ==
- François Boucher – The Judgement of Paris
- John Singleton Copley – Portraits of James Warren and Mercy Otis Warren
- Jean-Honoré Fragonard – The Little Park
- Jean-Baptiste Greuze – The Broken Mirror
- Francesco Guardi – Miracle of a Dominican Saint (for San Pietro Martire (Murano))
- Matthäus Günther – Frescos in Benedictine Abbey Church of St. Marinus and St. Anianus, Rott am Inn
- Philip James de Loutherbourg – Landscape with Figures and Animals
- Joshua Reynolds – Portrait of Alexander Hood
- Dominic Serres – Princess Charlotte Arriving at Harwich
- George Stubbs (approximate date; Tate Britain)
  - Horse Frightened by Lion
  - Horse Devoured by a Lion
- Benjamin West
  - The Cricketers
  - Cymon and Iphigenia (lost)
  - Portrait of Robert Monckton
- Johann Zoffany
  - Three sons of the Earl of Bute
  - Venice Preserv'd
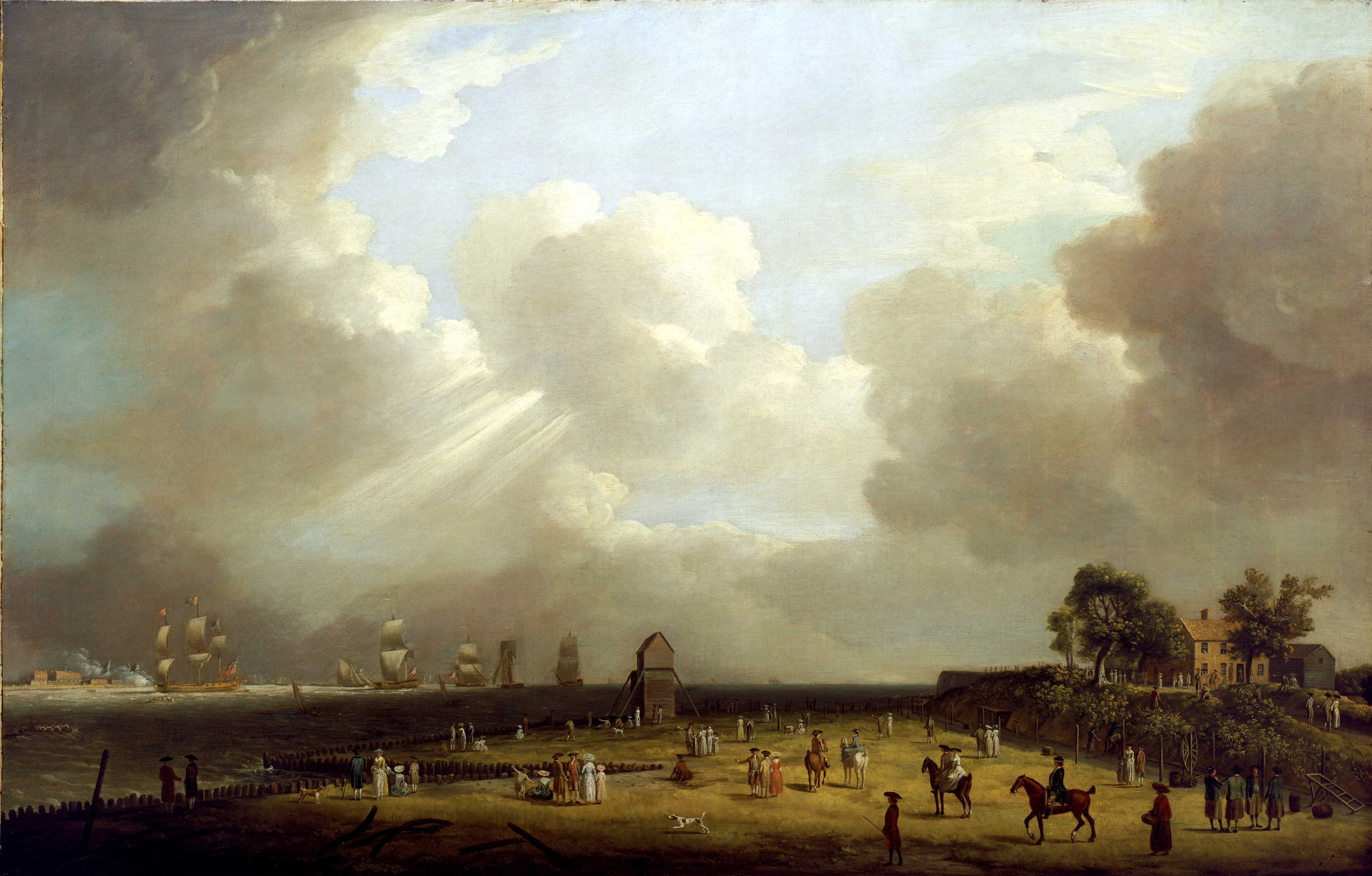
Princess Charlotte Arriving at Harwich by Dominic Serres

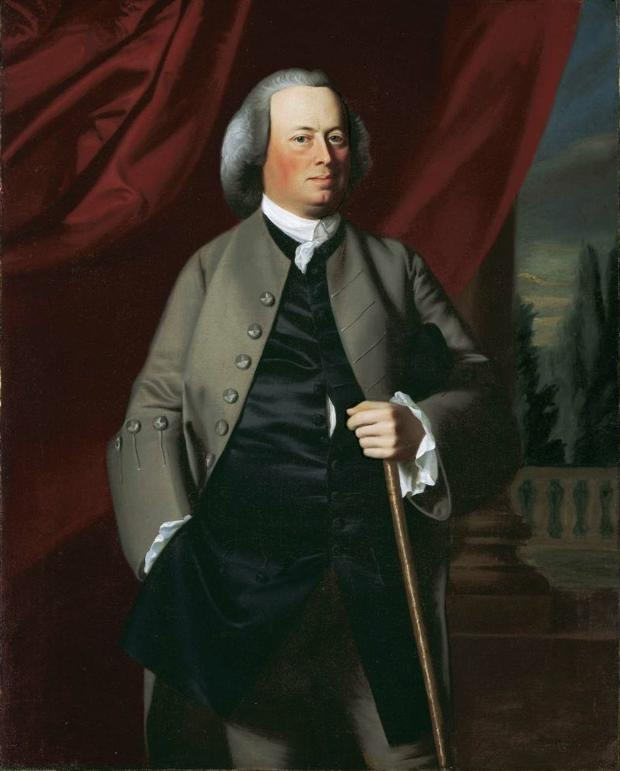
Copley – James Warren

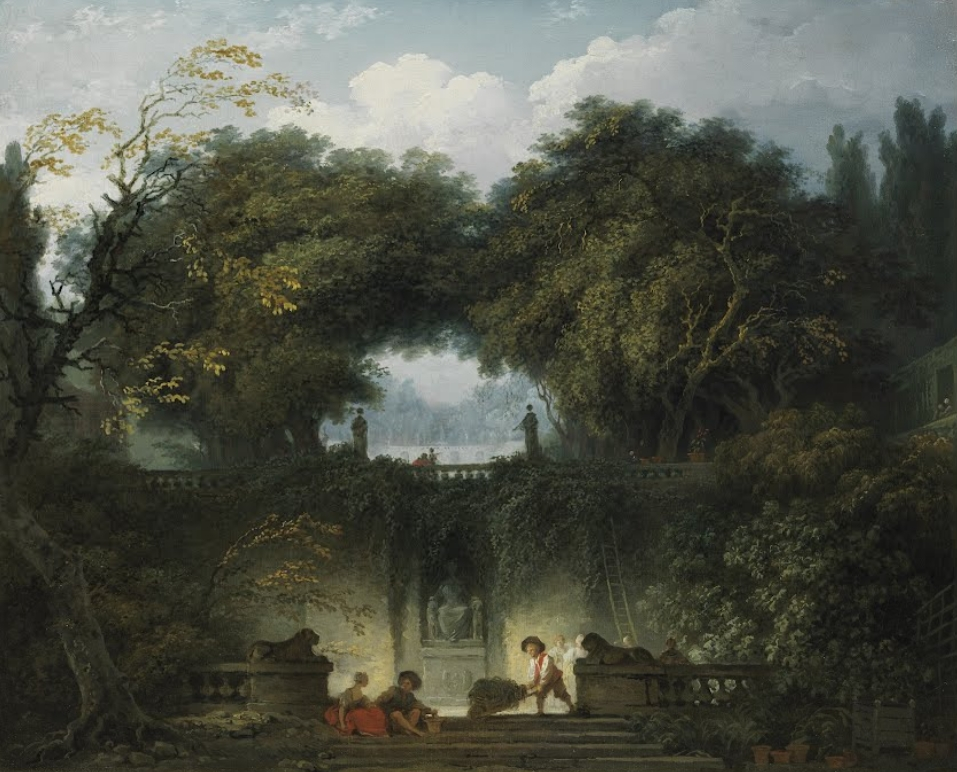
The Little Park by Jean-Honoré Fragonard

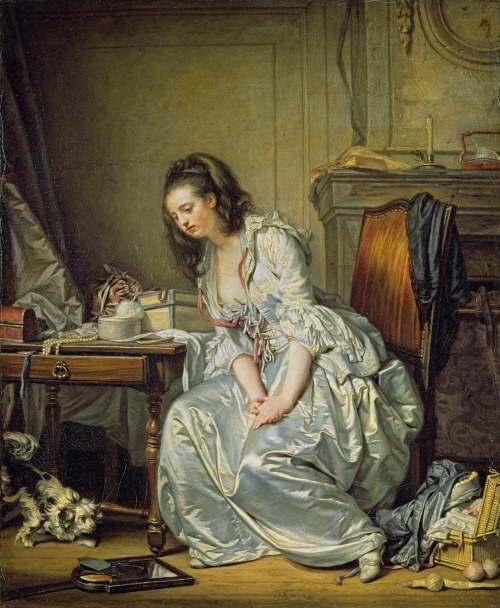
The Broken Mirror by Jean-Baptiste Greuze

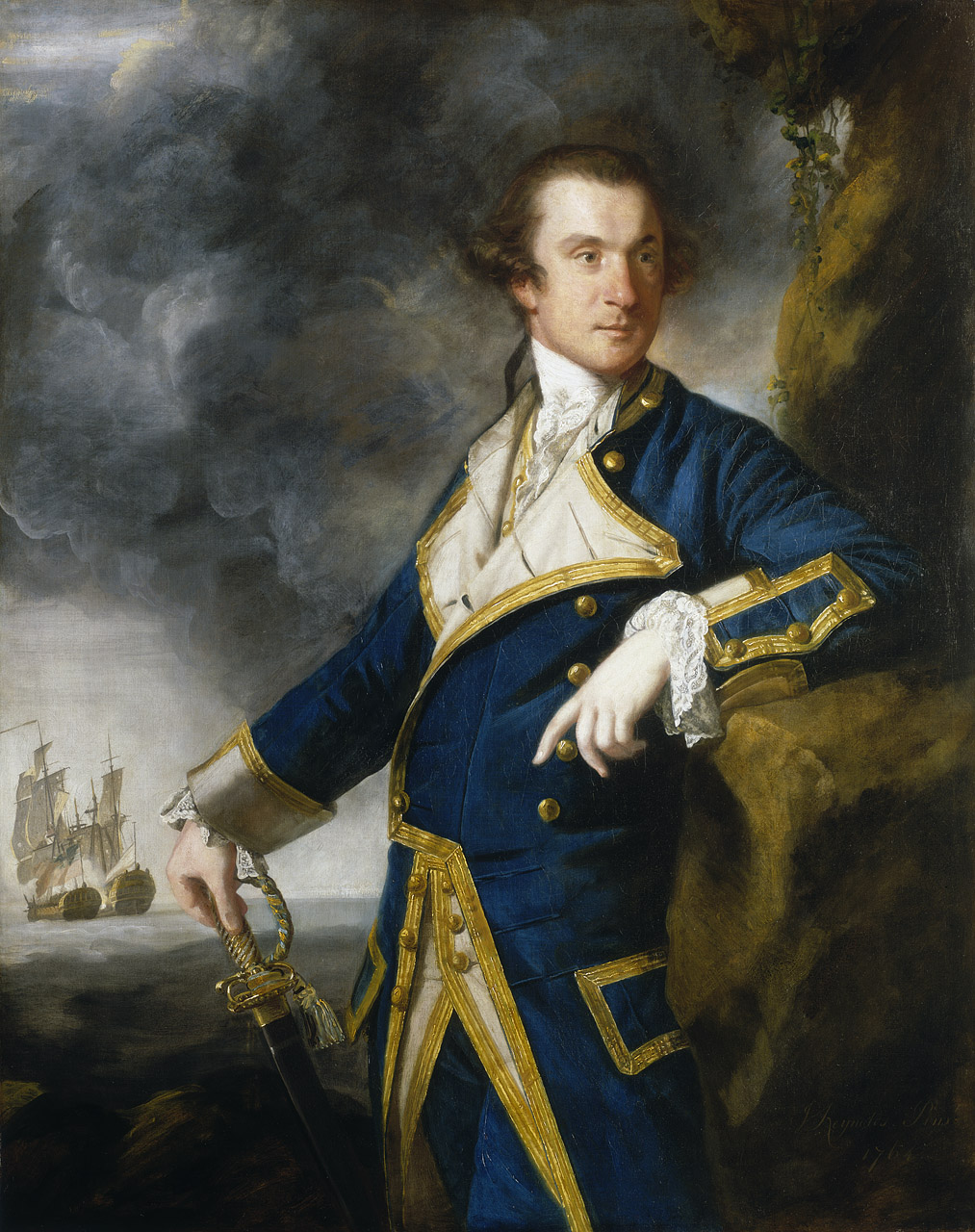
Portrait of Alexander Hood by Joshua Reynolds

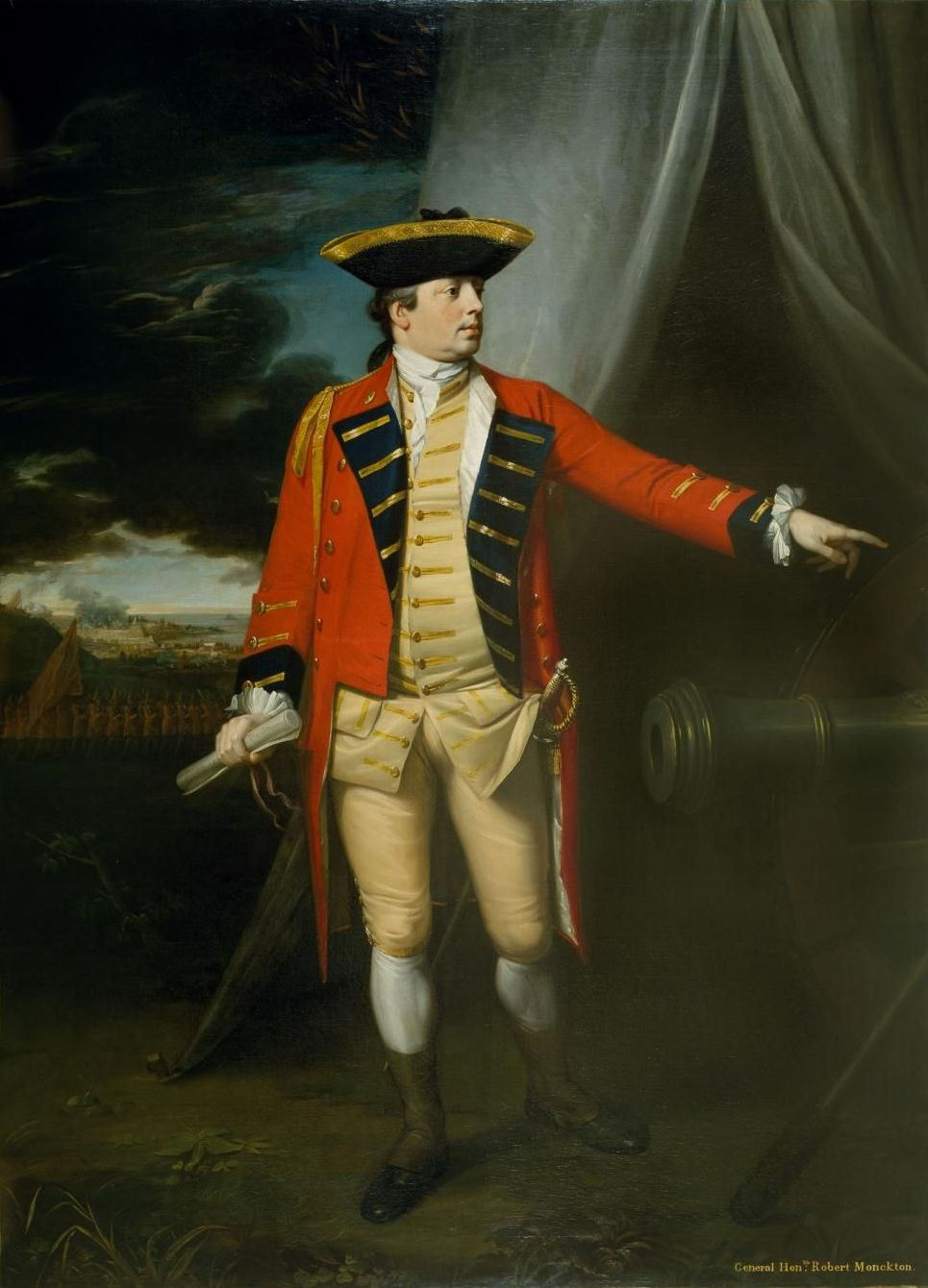
Portrait of Robert Monckton by Benjamin West

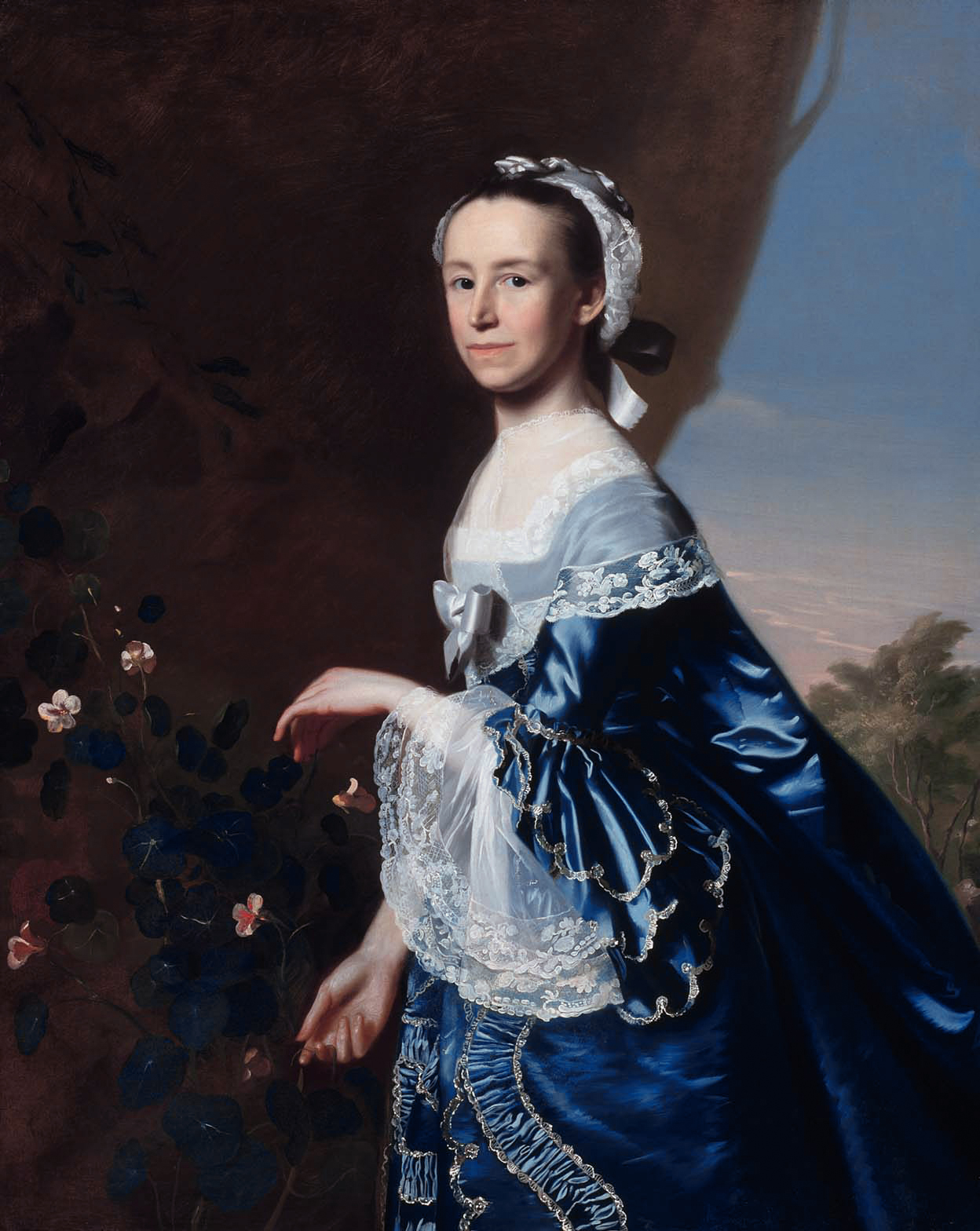
Copley – Mercy Otis Warren

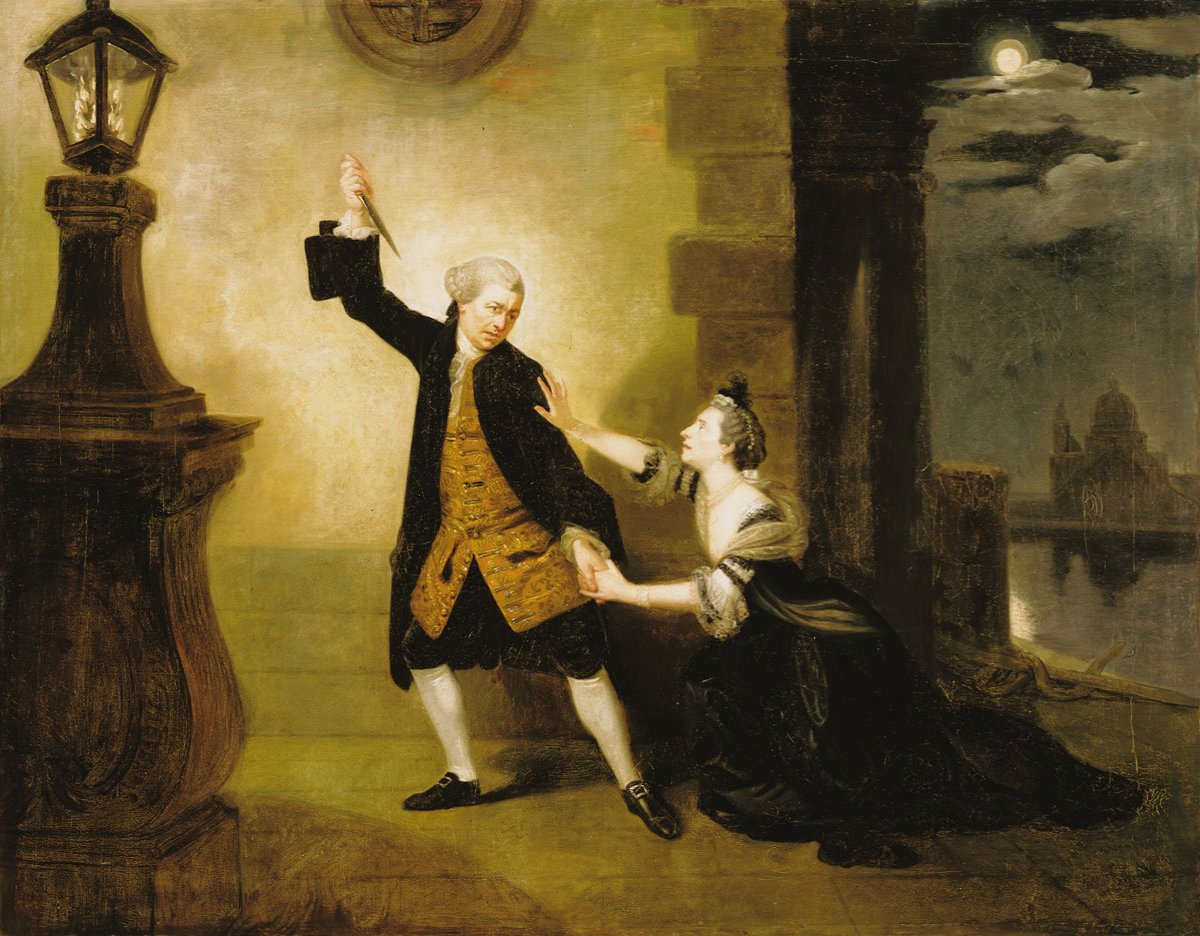
Venice Preserv'd by Johan Zoffany

== Births ==
- June 26 – George Morland, English painter of animals and rustic scenes (died 1804)
- July 22 – Johann Heinrich Ramberg, German painter and printmaker (died 1840)
- August 7 – Johann Jakob Biedermann, Swiss painter and etcher (died 1830)
- November 19 – Karl Ludwig Fernow, art critic (died 1808)
- November 25 – Jean Germain Drouais, French historical painter (died 1788)
- December 12 – Margareta Alströmer, Swedish painter and singer and a member of the Royal Swedish Academy of Arts (died 1816)
- date unknown
  - Pietro Bettelini, Italian engraver (died 1828)
  - Antoine-Denis Chaudet, French sculptor in the neoclassical style (died 1810)
  - Joseph-François Ducq, Flemish historical and portrait painter (died 1829)
  - Augustin Félix Fortin, French painter of landscapes, and of genre and historical subjects (died 1832)
  - Philippe Auguste Hennequin, French painter (died 1833)
  - Andrew Plimer, English miniaturist (died 1837)
  - Zacarías González Velázquez, Spanish painter (died 1834)
  - Andries Vermeulen, Dutch painter (died 1814)

== Deaths ==
- January 3 – Francesco Maria Schiaffino, Italian sculptor (born 1688)
- January 21 – Jean-François Oeben, cabinet-maker (born 1721)
- March 4 – Johan Hörner, Swedish-Danish painter (born 1711)
- April – Franz Xaver Feuchtmayer, German Baroque stucco plasterer of the Wessobrunner School (born 1698)
- April 18 – Franz Anton Bustelli, porcelain modeller (born 1723)
- May 24 – Luis González Velázquez, Spanish late-Baroque painter (born 1715)
- September 24 – Hendrik Frans van Lint, landscape painter from the Southern Netherlands (born 1684)
- October – Anna Maria Garthwaite, English textile designer (born 1688)
- October 22 – Frans van Mieris jr., Dutch painter (born 1689)
- December 3 – Giuseppe Nogari, Venetian painter of the Rococo, where he painted mainly painted half-body portraits (born 1699)
- date unknown
  - Kim Du-ryang, Korean genre works painter of the mid Joseon period (born 1696)
  - Carlo Salis, Italian painter, born in Verona (born 1680)
  - Gervase Spencer, English miniaturist (born 1715)
  - Jan van Gool, Dutch painter and biographer (born 1685)
- probable – Cao Xueqin, Chinese writer, painter of cliffs and rocks, poet (born 1715)
