= Little Park =

Little Park may refer to:

- Home Park, Windsor, an area of parkland associated with Windsor Castle
- Little Park, Roose, a former sports venue in Barrow-in-Furness
- The Little Park, a 1763 painting by Jean-Honoré Fragonard
