= The cricketers =

The cricketers may refer to:

- The Cricketers (West), a 1769 painting by Benjamin West
- The cricketers (Drysdale), a 1948 painting by Russell Drysdale
