= Harwich Lighthouse (painting) =

Painting by John Constable

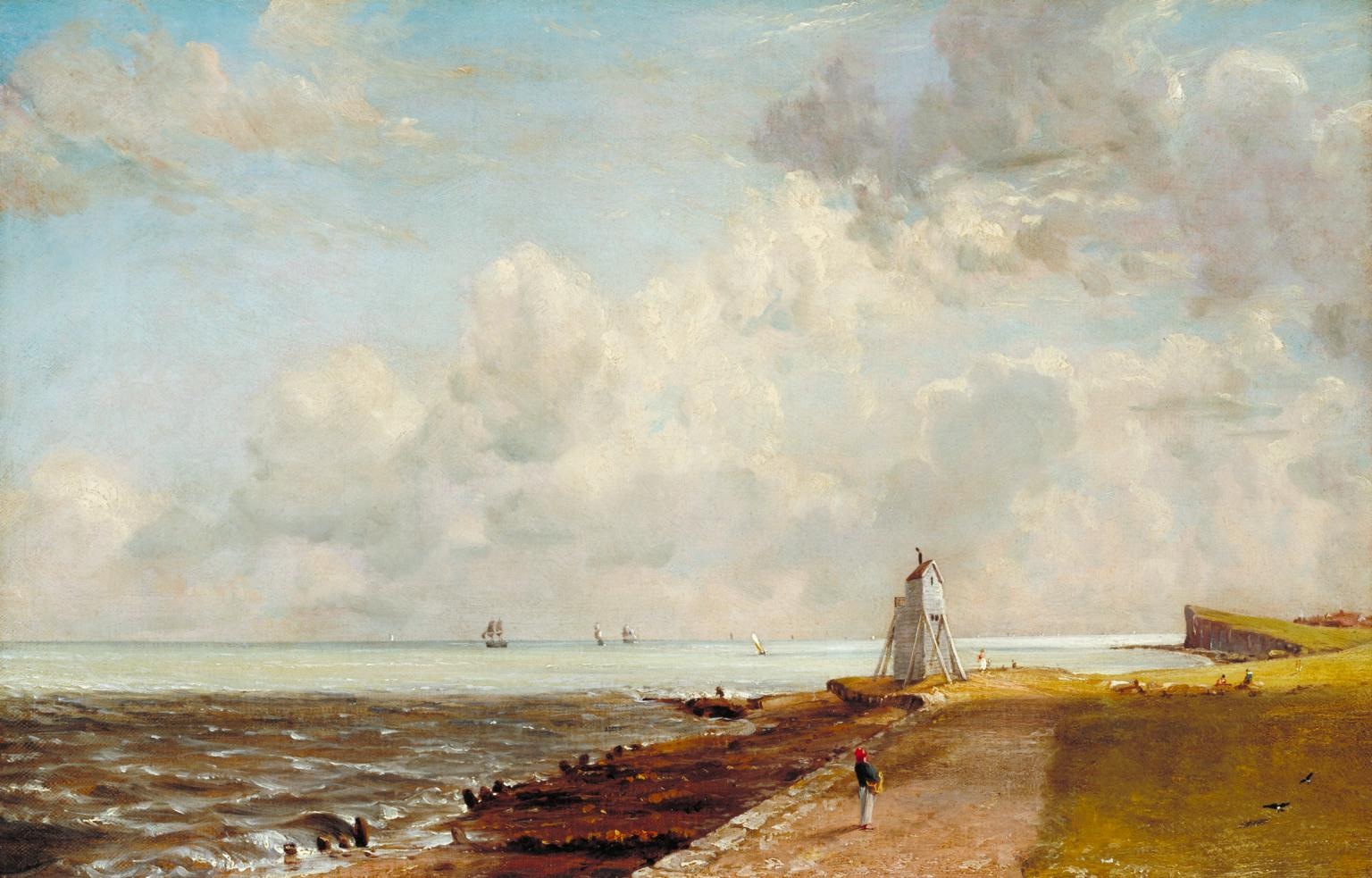
- Artist: John Constable
- Year: 1820
- Type: Oil on canvas, landscape painting
- Dimensions: 32.7 cm × 50.2 cm (12.9 in × 19.8 in)
- Location: Tate Britain, London

Harwich Lighthouse is an 1820 landscape painting by the British painter John Constable. It depicts a scene on the coast of Essex in England featuring Harwich Low Lighthouse. The lighthouse was maintained by Constable's patron General Rebow whose estate at Wivenhoe Park he also painted.

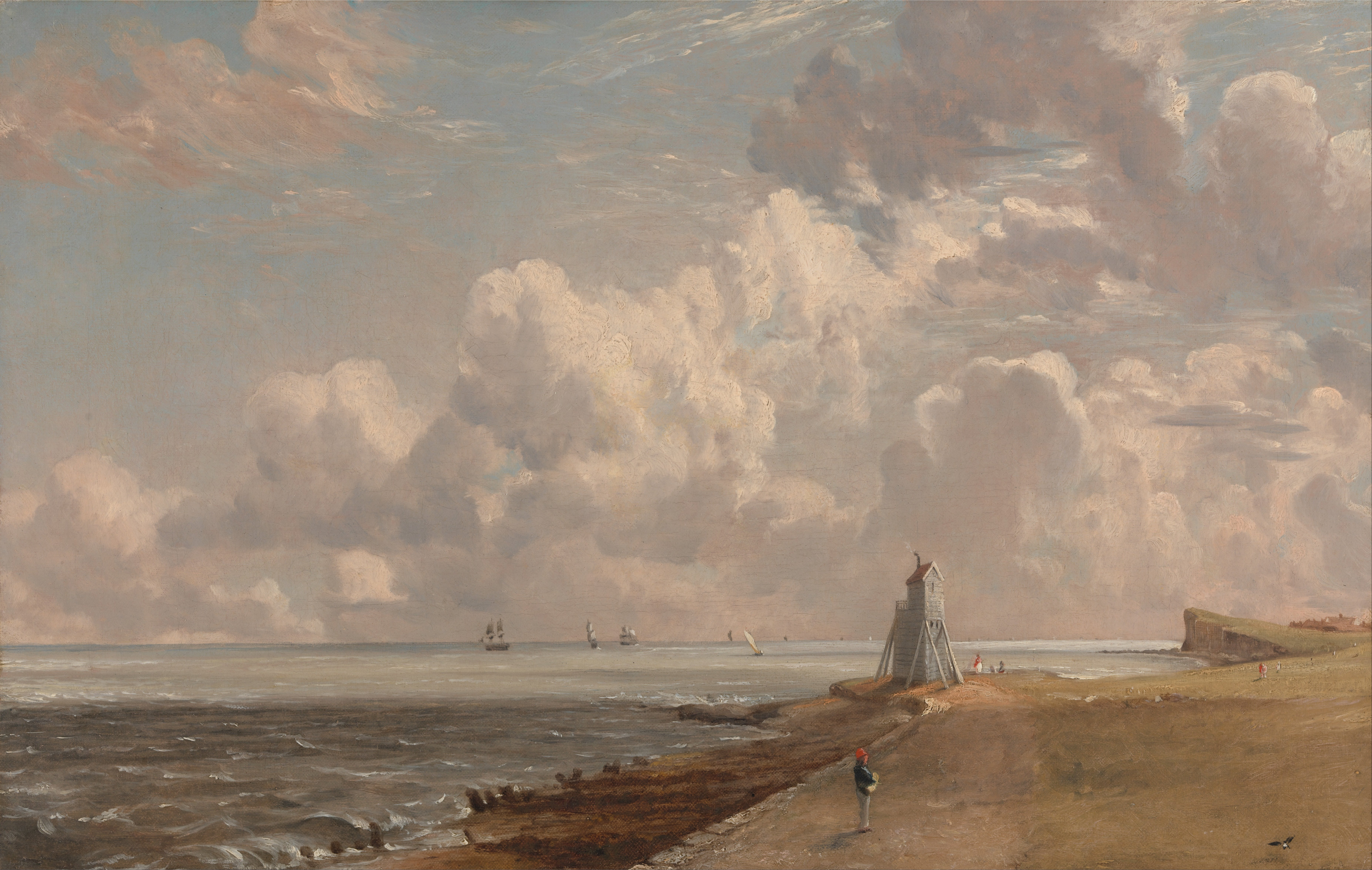
Version of the painting in the Yale Center for British Art

It was exhibited at the Royal Academy's Summer Exhibition in 1820 along with Stratford Mill where it was well received. Constable produced three almost identical versions of the painting. The copy in the collection of Tate Britain having initially been given by the artist's daughter Isabel to the National Gallery in 1888 as part of the Constable Bequest. Another version is in the Yale Center for British Art.

== See also ==
- List of paintings by John Constable
- Princess Charlotte Arriving at Harwich, a 1763 painting by Dominic Serres

== Bibliography ==
- Bailey, Anthony. John Constable: A Kingdom of his Own. Random House, 2012.
- Charles, Victoria. Constable. Parkstone International, 2015.
- Hamilton, James. Constable: A Portrait. Hachette UK, 2022.
- Reynolds, Graham. Constable's England. Metropolitan Museum of Art, 1983.
- Thornes, John E. John Constable's Skies: A Fusion of Art and Science. A&C Black, 1999.
