= Salon of 1763 =

1763 art exhibition in Paris

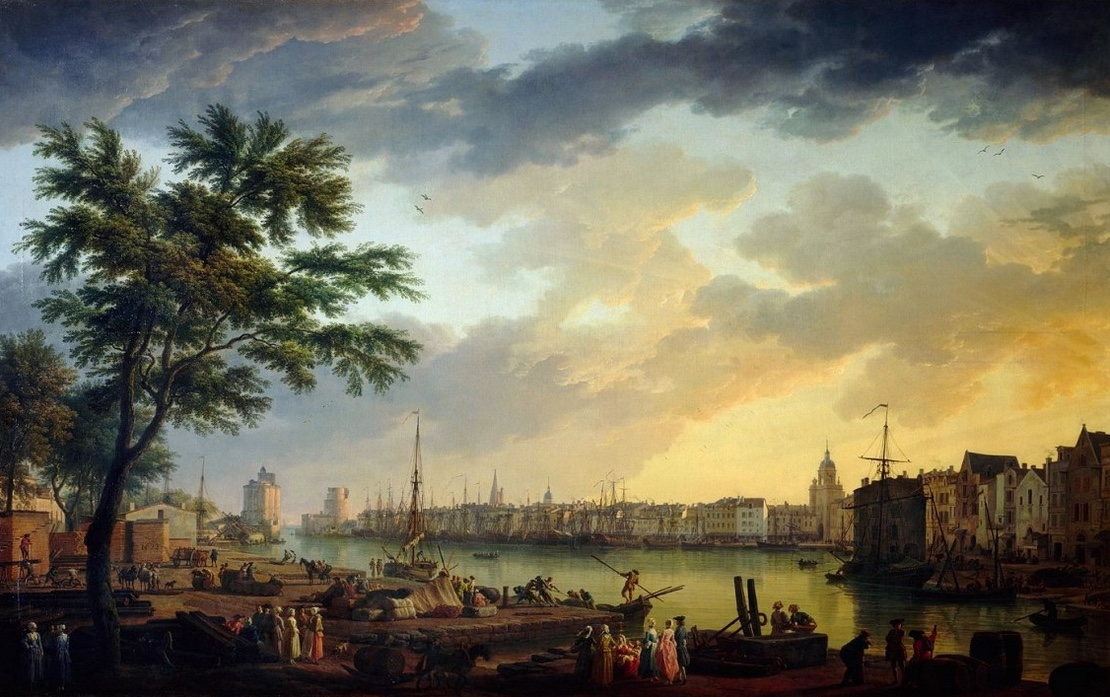
View of the Port of La Rochelle by Joseph Vernet

The Salon of 1763 was an art exhibition held at the Louvre in Paris. It was held during the Ancien Régime era and was overseen by the Académie Royale. Staged during the reign of Louis XV it took place the same years as the Treaty of Paris ended the Seven Years' War. Many of the works featured were Rococo in style. Nonetheless The Cupid Seller by Joseph-Marie Vien was an early example of the Neoclassicism that would displace rococo to become the dominant style of the later nineteenth century.

Philip James de Loutherbourg, a young painter from Alsace, made his Salon debut with Landscape with Figures and Animals. The praise it received from the critic Denis Diderot boosted his career. The marine painter Joseph Vernet displayed views of La Rochelle and Rochefort as part of his Views of the Ports of France series. As he did in other Salons, Diderot strongly praised Vernet's works for their faithful attention to real life. Jean-Baptiste Greuze displayed genre paintings such as Filial Piety, The Broken Mirror and Tender Memory.

In sculpture Étienne Maurice Falconet submitted Pygmalion and Galatea and Douce Mélancolie. Henri-Horace Roland Delaporte exhibited several still lifes. In portraiture François-Hubert Drouais displayed a double picture of the future Charles X and his sister Clotilde as children. It was followed by the Salon of 1765.

== Gallery ==
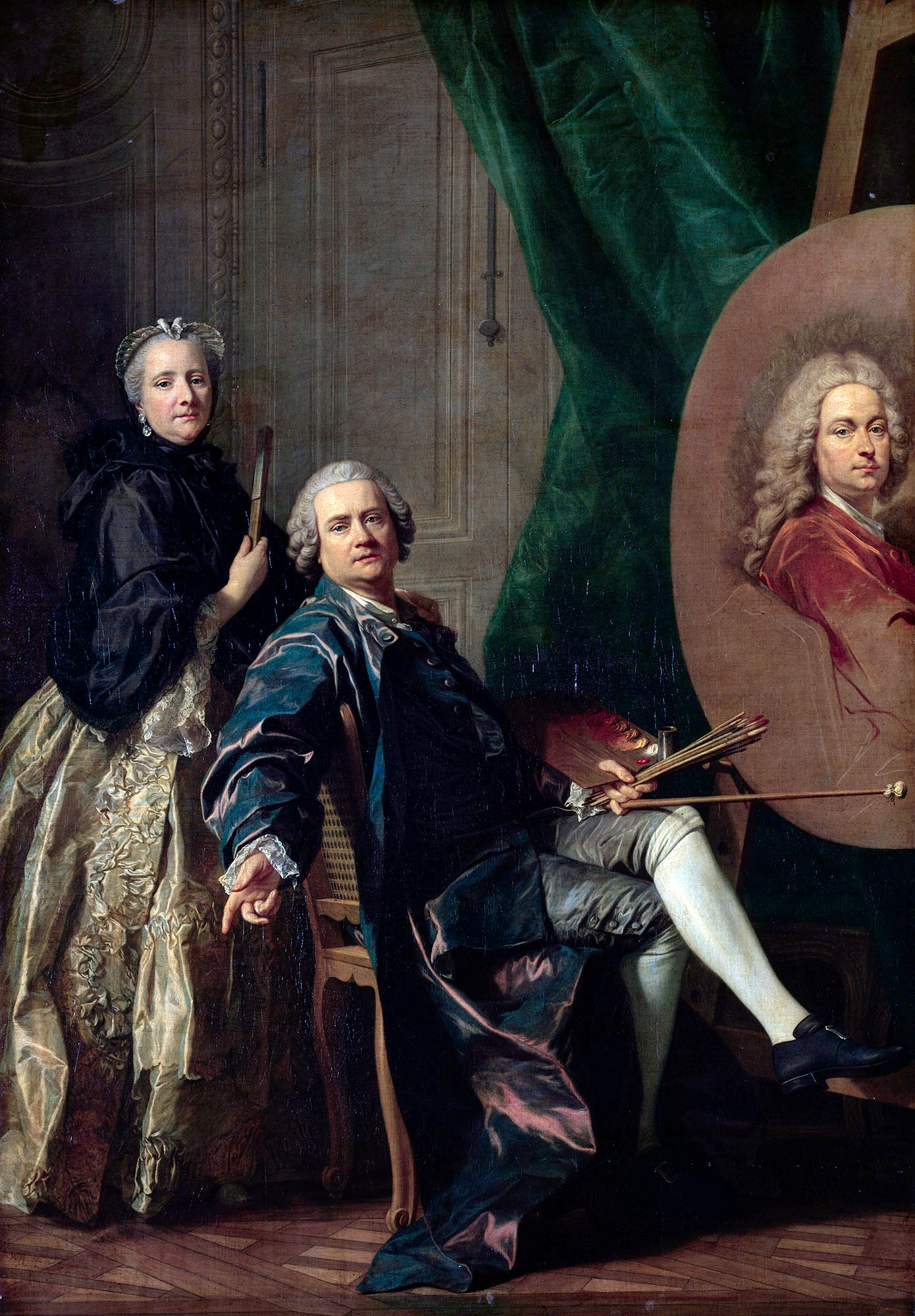
Self-Portrait by Louis-Michel van Loo

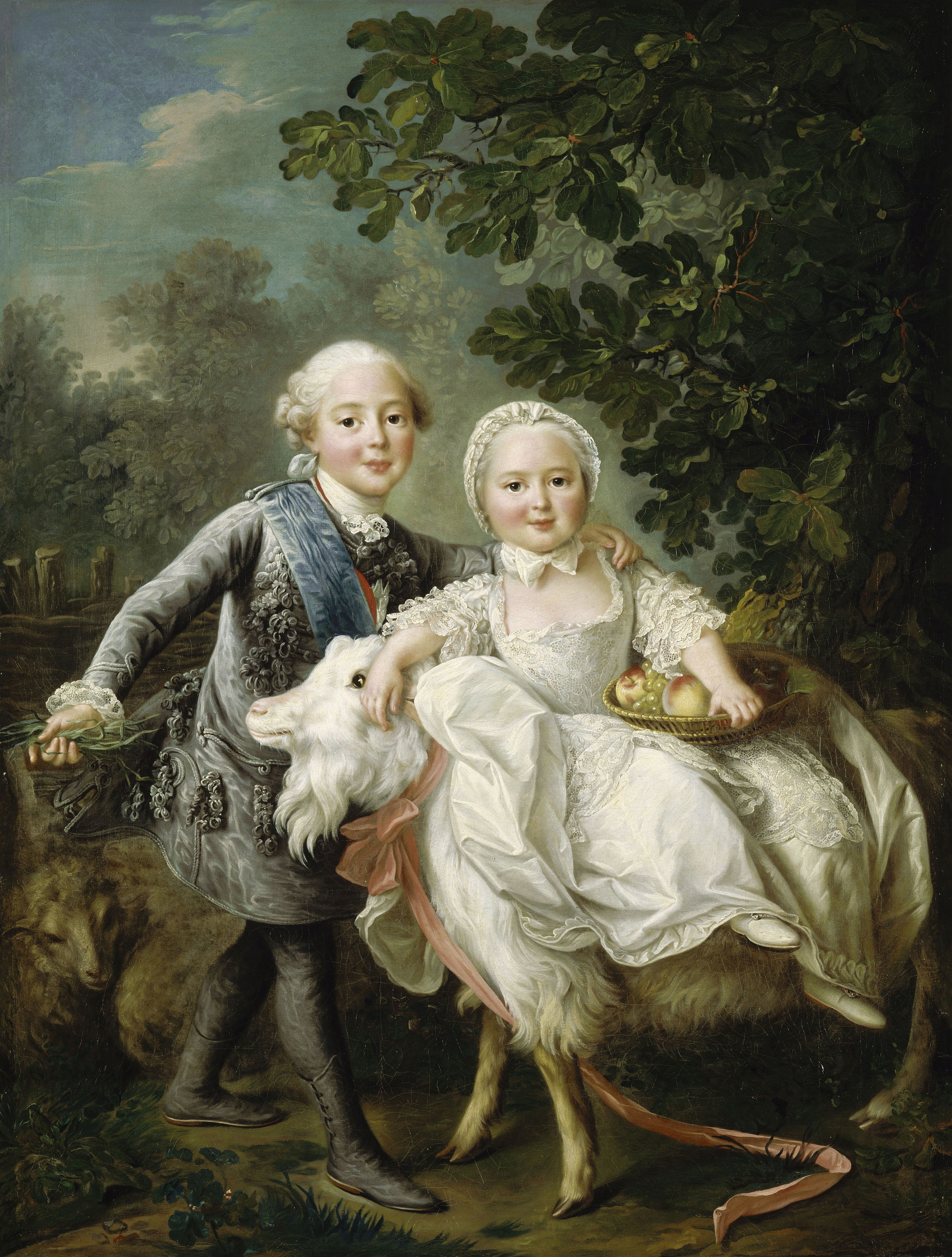
The Count of Artois and his sister Clotilde by François-Hubert Drouais

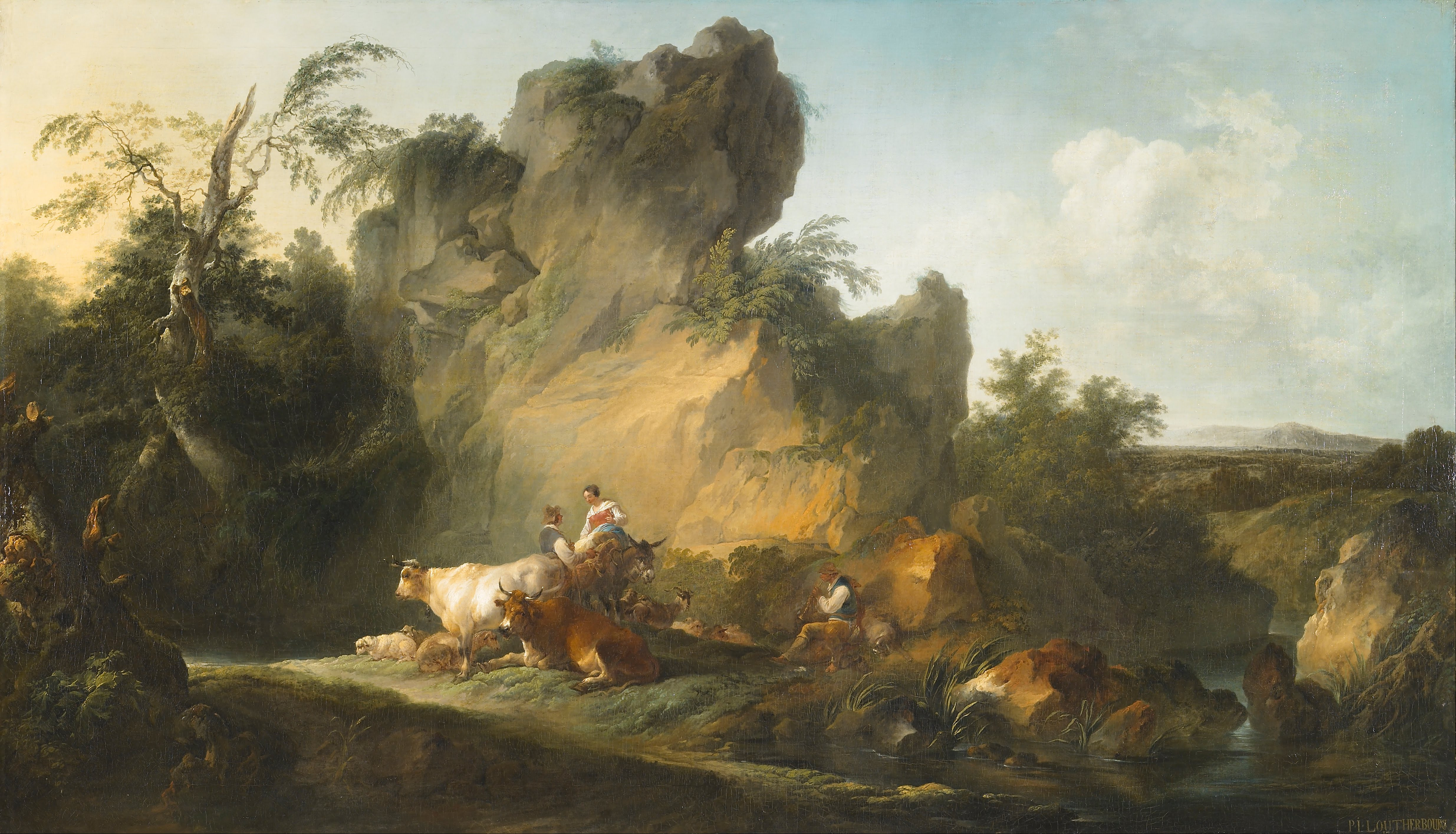
Landscape with Figures and Animals by Philip James de Loutherbourg

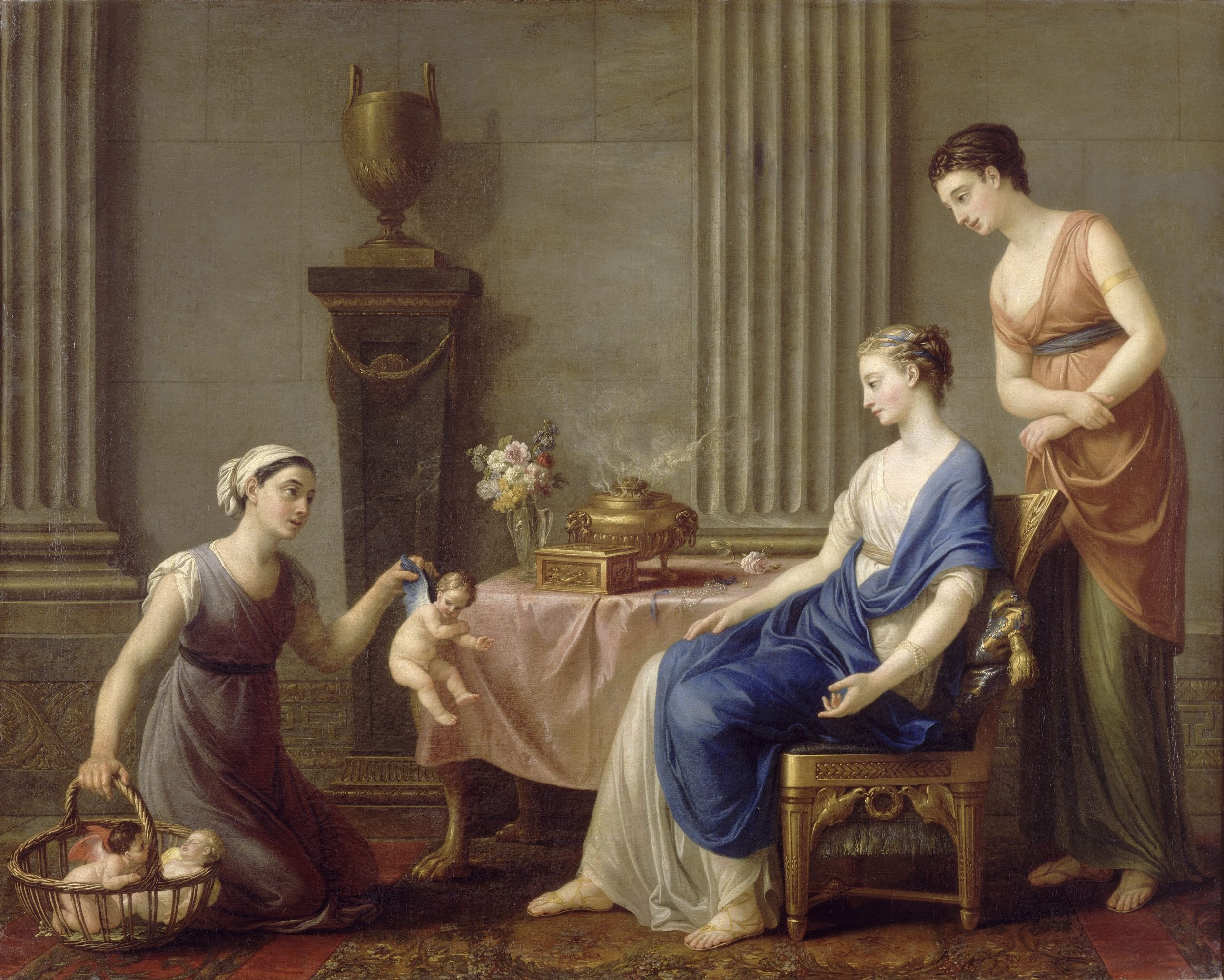
The Cupid Seller by Joseph-Marie Vien

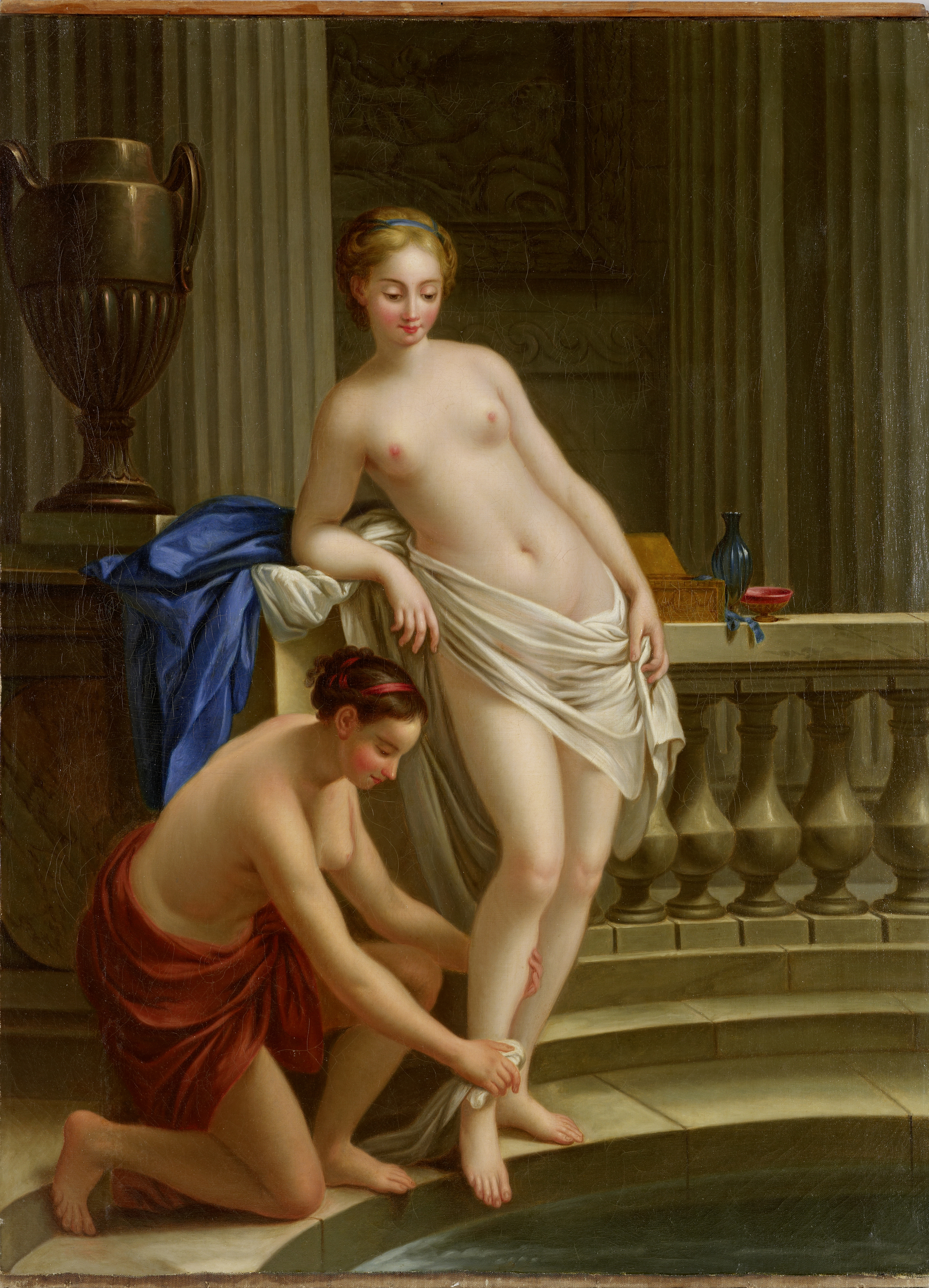
Two Women Bathing by Joseph-Marie Vien

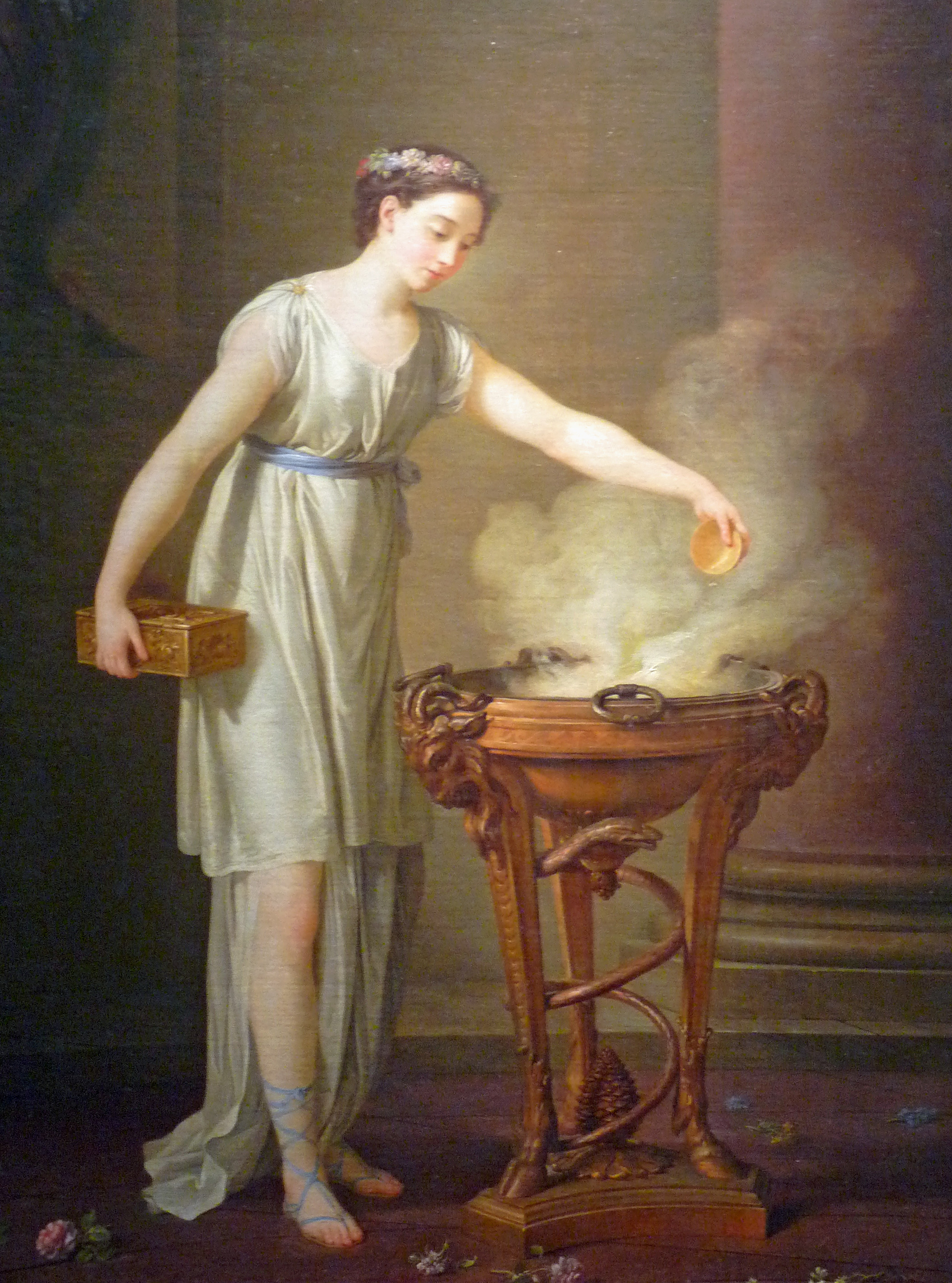
The Virtuous Athenian Woman by Joseph-Marie Vien

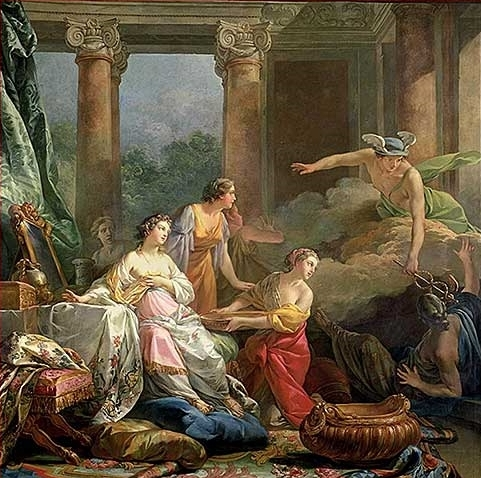
Mercury, Herse and Aglauros by Jean-Baptiste Marie Pierre

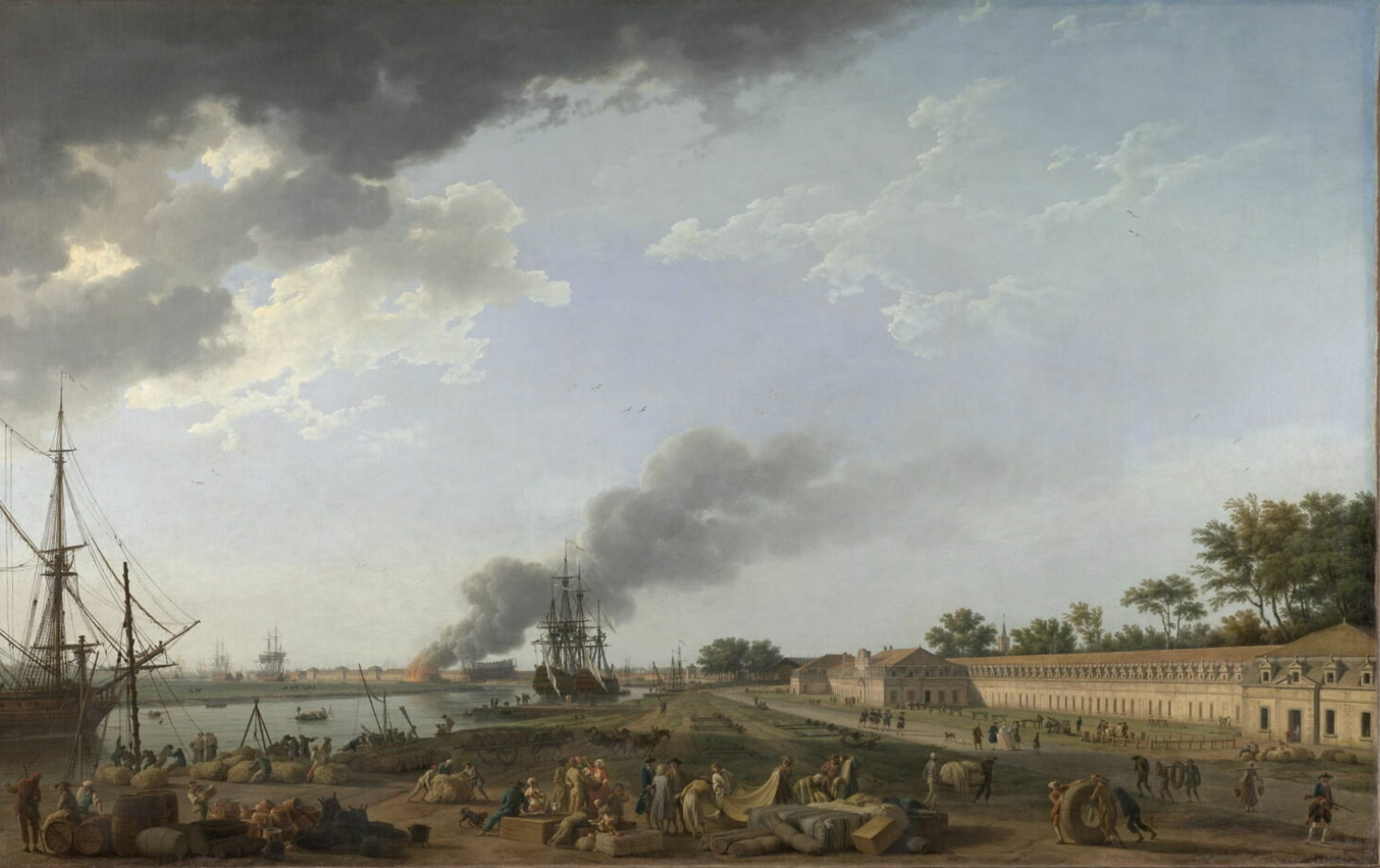
View of Rochefort Harbour from the Magasin des Colonies by Joseph Vernet

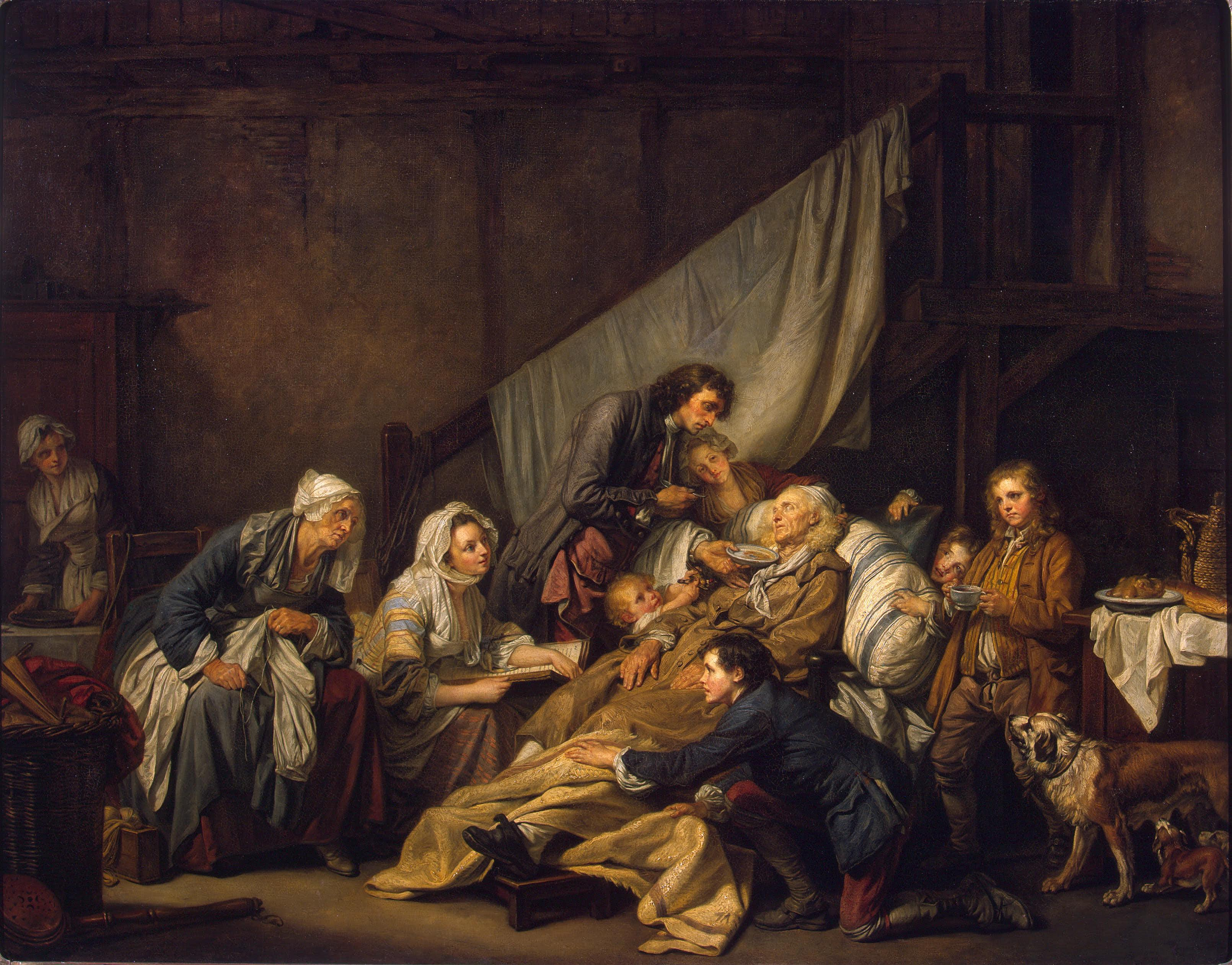
Filial Piety by Jean-Baptiste Greuze

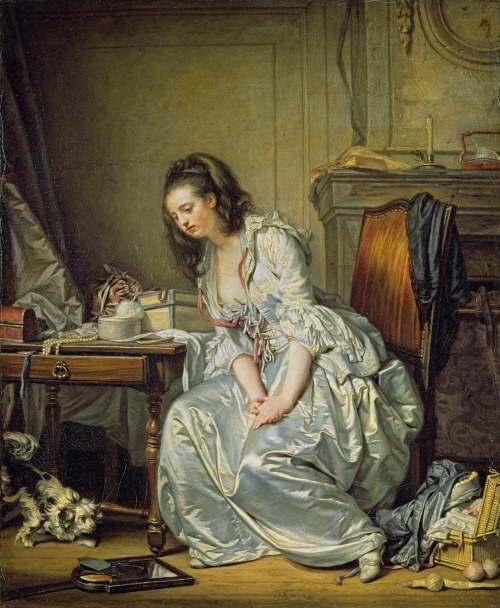
The Broken Mirror by Jean-Baptiste Greuze

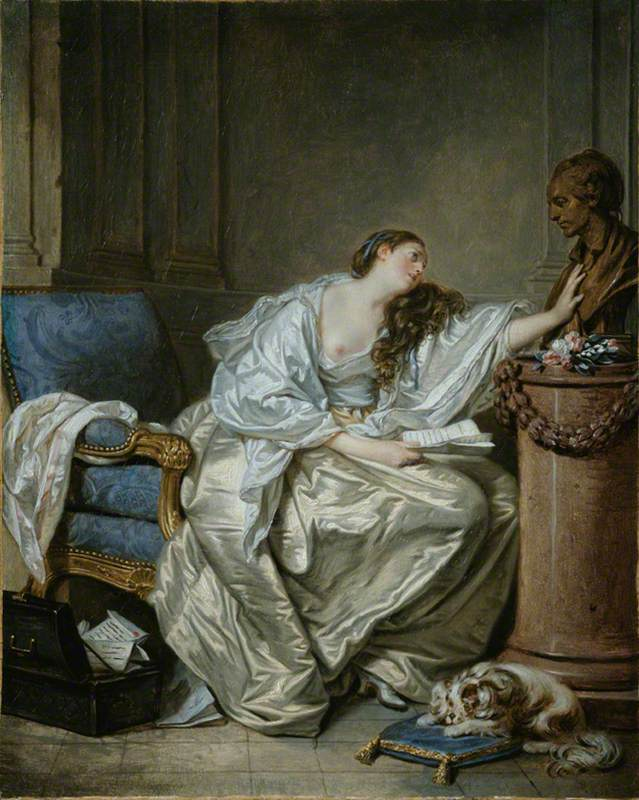
Tender Memory by Jean-Baptiste Greuze

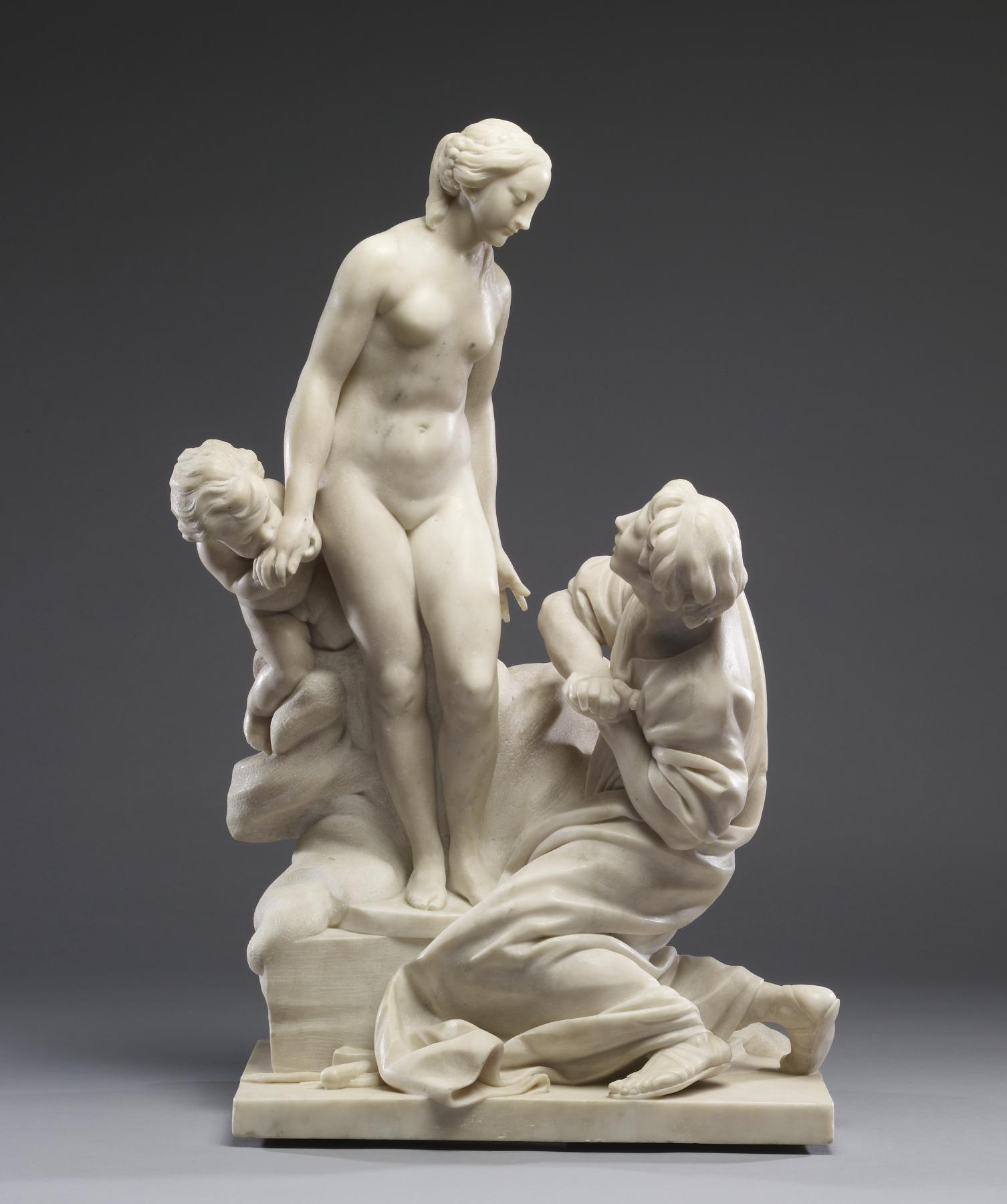
Pygmalion and Galatea by Étienne Maurice Falconet

== Bibliography ==
- Fried, Michael. Absorption and Theatricality: Painting and Beholder in the Age of Diderot. University of Chicago Press, 1988.
- Levey, Michael. Painting and Sculpture in France, 1700–1789. Yale University Press, 1993.
- Murray, Christopher John. Encyclopedia of the Romantic Era, 1760–1850, Volume 2. Taylor & Francis, 2004.
- Pierce, Gillian B. Scapeland: Writing the Landscape from Diderot’s Salons to the Postmodern Museum. Rodopi, 2012.
- Rosenblum, Robert. Transformations in Late Eighteenth Century Art. Princeton University Press, 1970.
- Schenker, Alexander M. The Bronze Horseman: Falconet's Monument to Peter the Great. Yale University Press, 2003.
