= Two Women Bathing =

Painting by Joseph-Marie Vien

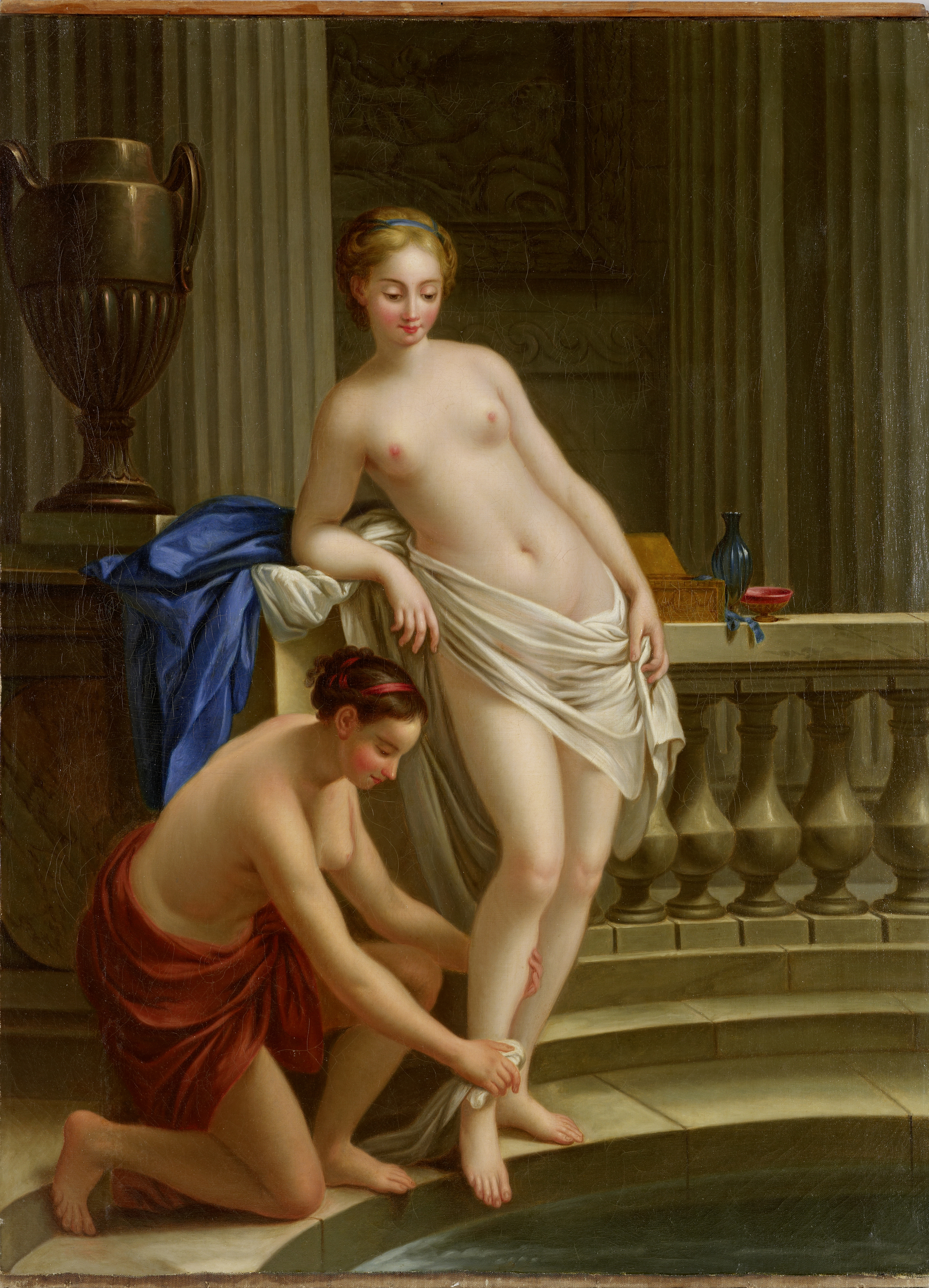
- Artist: Joseph-Marie Vien
- Year: c. 1763
- Type: Oil on canvas
- Dimensions: 92.3 cm × 67.9 cm (36.3 in × 26.7 in)
- Location: Musée de Cahors Henri-Martin, Cahors

Two Women Bathing is an oil painting by French artist Joseph-Marie Vien, from c. 1763. A copy of it is held in the Musée de Cahors Henri-Martin, in Cahors. The original was commissioned by Louis Philippe I, Duke of Orléans and first exhibited at the Salon of 1763. Several versions are mentioned in various collections and institutions.

== Description and analysis ==
The painting, in the neoclassical style, depicts two nude women either entering or exiting a bath. The architecture of the setting is inspired by antiquity. A soft light illuminates primarily the main subject, a woman leaning against the balustrade, half-naked and partially covered by a white drape. Another woman, also present in the scene, presumably her servant, is also depicted half-naked and draped in red, kneeling at her mistress feet and holding her foot. The scene also includes a blue bottle and a blue sheet, adding another touch of color to the overall composition.

The composition is rectilinear and rigorous, with understated curves. The fluted columns and the metal vase in the background balance the curves of the balustrade, the basin, and the young woman's swaying hips. According to the work's former title, Callisto, Nymph of Diana, Emerging from the Bath, Accompanied by Her Attendant, it can be seen as an illustration of the mythological story of Callisto, who, seduced by Jupiter and pregnant by him, was transformed into a bear by a furious Diana.

== Reception ==
The work was well received. Philosopher Denis Diderot wrote about it during its exhibition at the Salon of 1763: "The paintings that Vien exhibited this year are all of the same kind, and since they almost all have the same merit, there is only one praise to be given: the elegance of the forms, the grace, the ingenuity, the innocence, the delicacy, the simplicity, and all this combined with the purity of the drawing, the beautiful color, the softness and the truth of the flesh."
