= Princess Charlotte Arriving at Harwich =

Painting by Dominic Serres

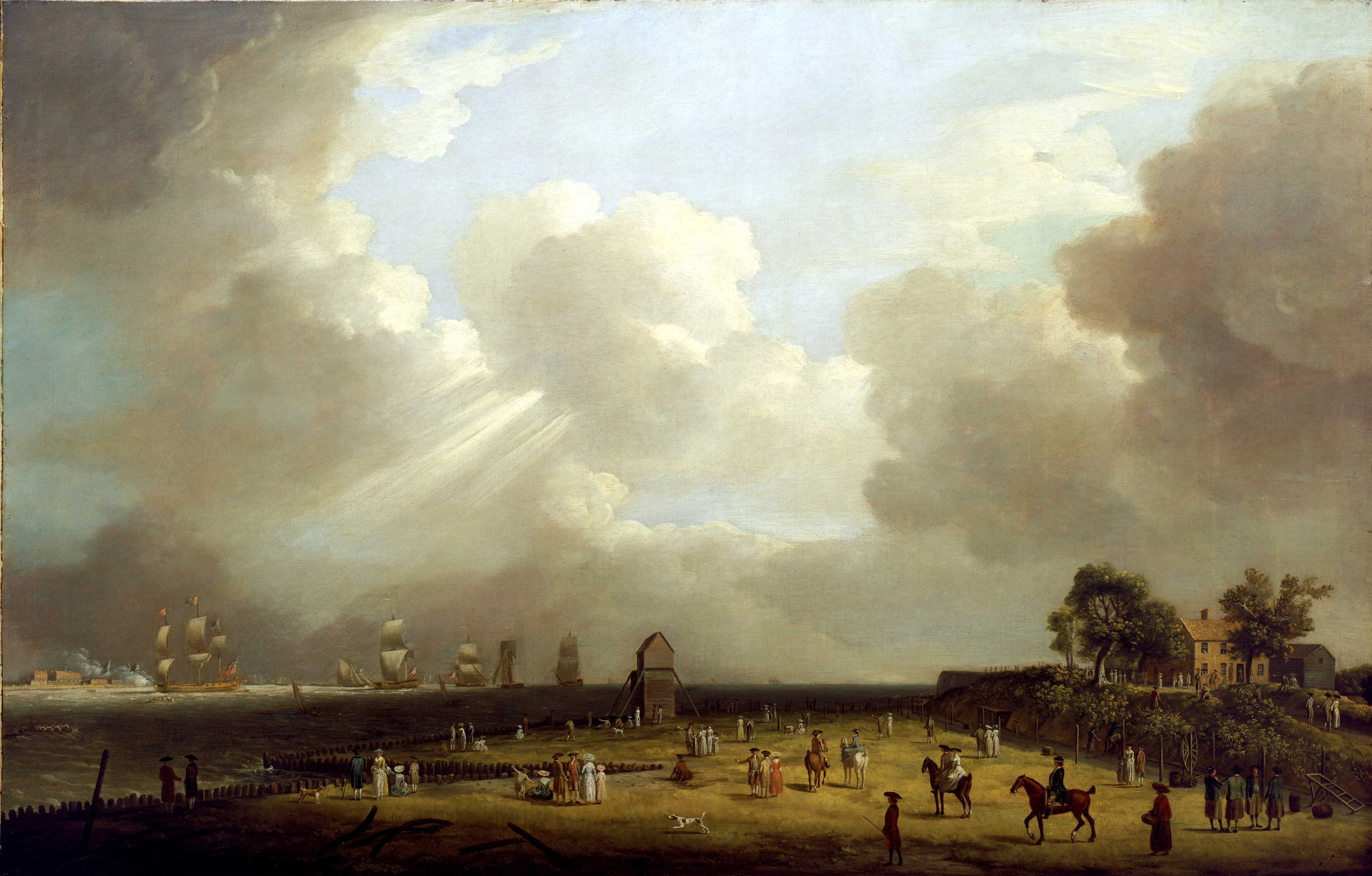
- Artist: Dominic Serres
- Year: 1763
- Type: Oil on canvas
- Dimensions: 81.2 cm × 129.5 cm (32.0 in × 51.0 in)
- Location: National Maritime Museum, Greenwich

Princess Charlotte Arriving at Harwich is an oil on canvas history painting by the French-born British artist Dominic Serres, from 1763.

== History and description ==
It shows Charlotte of Mecklenburg-Strelitz arriving at the port of Harwich in Essex aboard the royal yacht Royal Charlotte. Charlotte was arriving in England for her wedding with the British monarch George III and their joint coronation at Westminster Abbey. She had sailed from Cuxhaven escorted by the Admiral of the Fleet Lord Anson, at a time when Britain was fighting the Seven Years War against France and its allies. Serres himself travelled to Harwich to record the scene. The ship is shown passing the Landguard Fort on the Suffolk side of the River Orwell with a crowd of onlookers around the Low Lighthouse on the Harwich shore.

It was displayed at the exhibition of the Free Society of Artists in 1763. It is in the collection of the National Maritime Museum in Greenwich.

== See also ==
- Harwich Lighthouse, an 1820 painting by John Constable

== Bibliography ==
- Grigsby, J.E. Annals of Our Royal Yachts, 1604-1953. Adlard Coles, Limited, 1953.
- Quarm, Roger & Wilcox, Scott. Masters of the Sea: British Marine Watercolours. Phaidon Press, 1987.
- Russett, Alan. Dominic Serres, R.A., 1719–1793: War Artist to the Navy. Antique Collectors' Club, 2001.
