= The Broken Mirror =

Painting by Jean-Baptiste Greuze

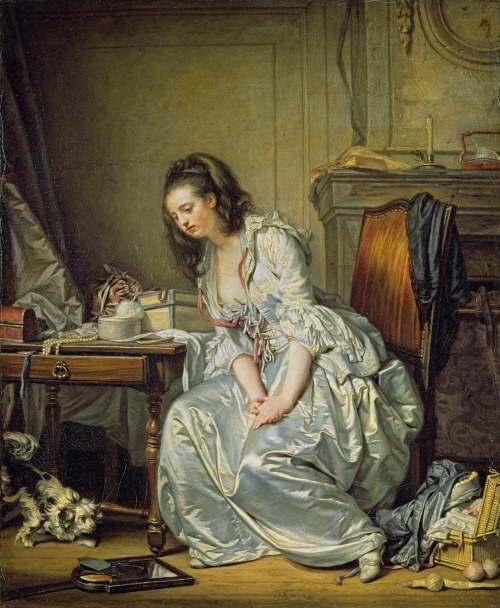
- Artist: Jean-Baptiste Greuze
- Year: 1762–63
- Type: Oil on canvas, genre painting
- Dimensions: 56 cm × 45.6 cm (22 in × 18.0 in)
- Location: Wallace Collection; London

The Broken Mirror (French: Le Miroir brisé) is an oil on canvas genre painting by the French artist Jean-Baptiste Greuze, from 1762-1763. It is held at the Wallace Collection, in London.

== History and description ==
A moralistic allegory, it functions as a parable. While ostensibly it portrays a young woman who has broken a mirror, the chaotic interior and her dress presents her as a careless woman who has lost her virginity, despite not being married and now regrets it.

It was one of a number of works Greuze intended to exhibit at the Salon of 1763 at the Louvre, in Paris, although it may not have ended up being displayed. Today it is in the Wallace Collection, in London, having been acquired in Rome by the Marquess of Hertford in 1845.

== Bibliography ==
- Bailey, Colin B. Jean-Baptiste Greuze: The Laundress. Getty Publications, 2000.
- Conisbee, Philip. French Genre Painting in the Eighteenth Century. National Gallery of Art, 2007.
- Fried, Michael. Absorption and Theatricality: Painting and Beholder in the Age of Diderot. University of Chicago Press, 1988.
- Munhall, Edgar. Greuze the Draftsman. Merrell, 2002.
