= Portrait of Alexander Hood =

Painting by Joshua Reynolds

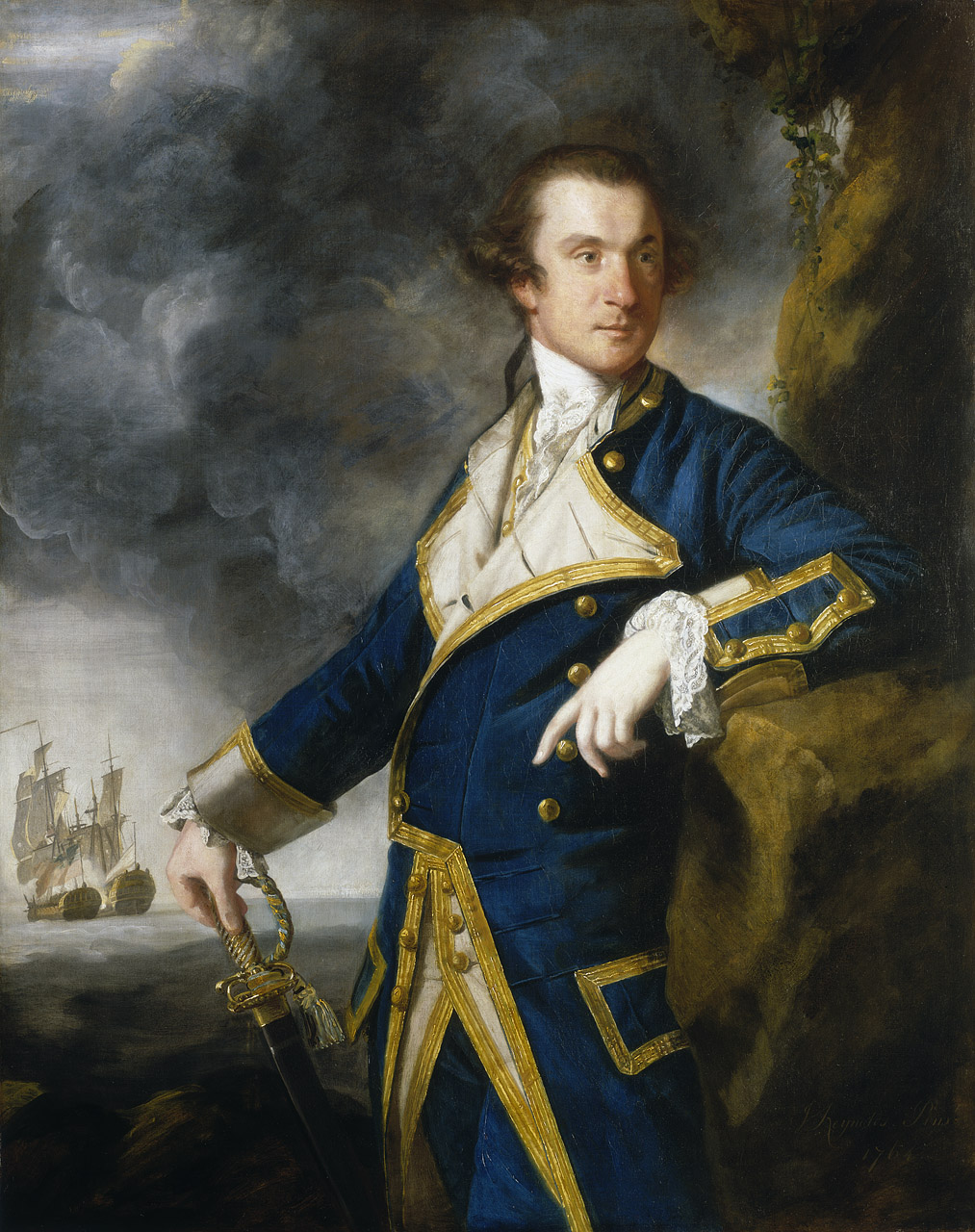
- Artist: Joshua Reynolds
- Year: 1763
- Type: Oil on canvas, portrait painting
- Dimensions: 130.8 cm × 104.5 cm (51.5 in × 41.1 in)
- Location: National Maritime Museum; London

Portrait of Alexander Hood is a 1763 portrait painting by the British artist Joshua Reynolds. It is a three-quarter-lengths depiction of the Royal Navy officer Alexander Hood.

The younger brother of Samuel Hood, he was already an experienced by the time he sat for the painting. During the Seven Years' War he had commanded the frigate HMS Minerva and was present at the Battle of Quiberon Bay, a decisive British victory that thwarted a planned French invasion. He served with distinction through the American War of Independence and the French Revolutionary Wars and for his role at the Glorious First of June was made Viscount Bridport.

The backdrop depicts a 1761 action in which he took the French ship Warwick, a former Royal Navy vessel captured by the French several years earlier. The painting is now in the collection of the National Maritime Museum in London, having previously hung in Greenwich Hospital.

== Bibliography ==
- Colville, Quintin. Nelson, Navy and Nation: The Royal Navy and the British People, 1688-1815. Bloomsbury Publishing, 2013.
- Fletcher, Charles Robert Leslie. Historical Portraits, 1700-1850: Volume 2. Clarendon Press, 1919.
