= Venice Preserv'd (painting) =

Painting by Johann Zoffany

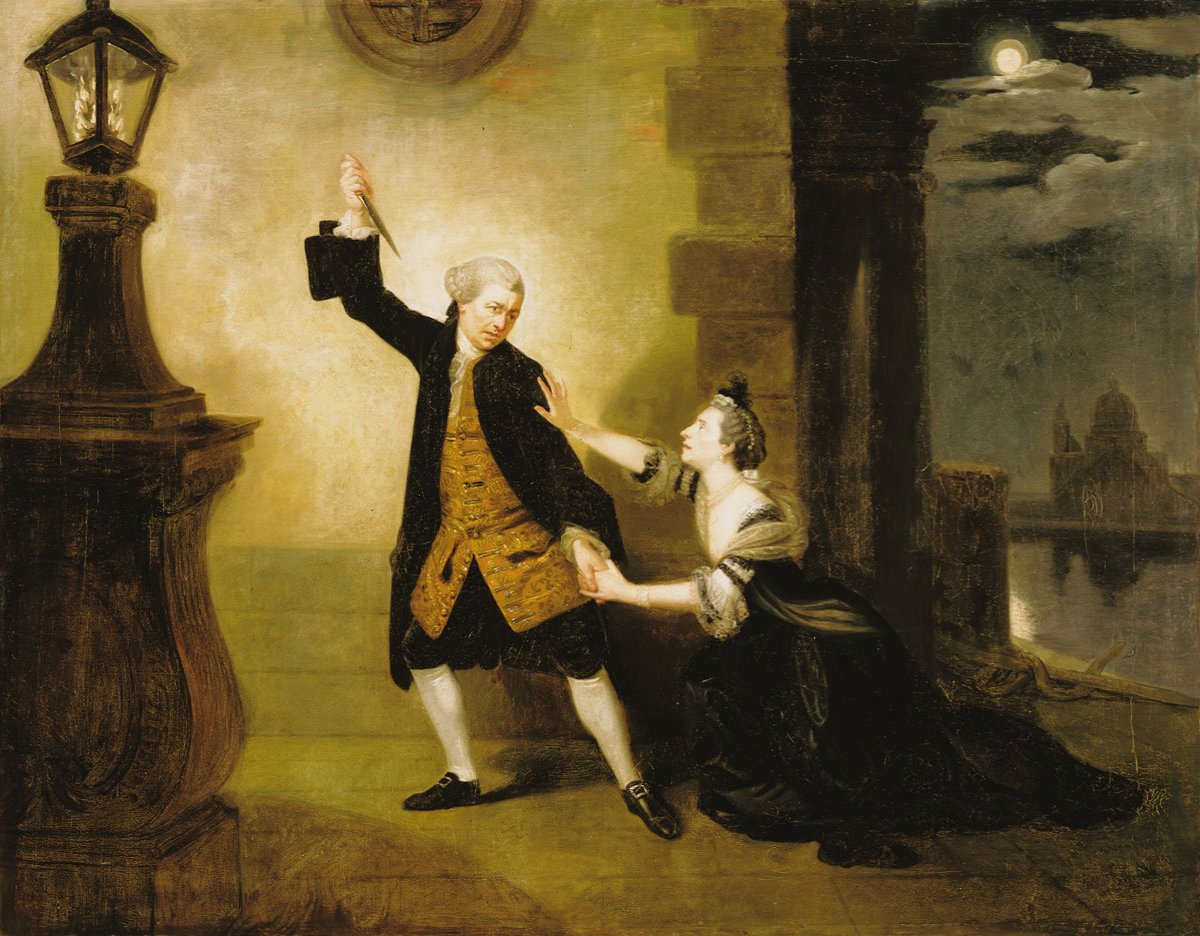
- Version in the Museum of Fine Arts
- Artist: Johan Zoffany
- Year: 1762-1763
- Type: Oil on canvas
- Dimensions: 71 cm × 91 cm (28 in × 36 in)
- Location: Museum of Fine Arts; Budapest

Venice Preserv'd is a 1763 oil on canvas painting by the German-born British artist Johan Zoffany. It depicts the actors David Garrick and Susannah Maria Cibber in the roles of Jaffeir and Belvidera in Thomas Otway's 1682 Restoration era tragedy Venice Preserv'd. It was one of a number of portraits of Garrick that helped build Zoffany's reputation in Britain.

Garrick was actor-manager of the Theatre Royal, Drury Lane in London's West End and the painting is set there. The stage design backdrop features the Grand Canal and the Santa Maria della Salute by moonlight. As was common at the time the actors are shown performing in fashionable, contemporary dress of the 1760s rather than authentic costume of historic Venice. It was exhibited at the Society of Artists, a precursor to the Royal Academy, at the Exhibition of 1763. Four versions of the painting are known to exist, including at the Museum of Fine Arts in Budapest. The original was bought by Garrick and hung in the dining room of his townhouse in the Adelphi area of London. James MacArdell produced a popular mezzotint based on Zoffany's work.

== Bibliography ==
- Highfill, Philip H., Burnim, Kalman A. & Langhans, Edward A. A Biographical Dictionary of Actors, Volume 6, Garrick to Gyngell: Actresses, Musicians, Dancers, Managers, and Other Stage Personnel in London 1660-1800. SIU Press, 1978.
- Kenny, Shirley Strum (ed.) British Theatre and the Other Arts, 1660-1800. Associated University Presses, 1984.
