= Landscape with Figures and Animals =

Painting by Philip James de Loutherbourg

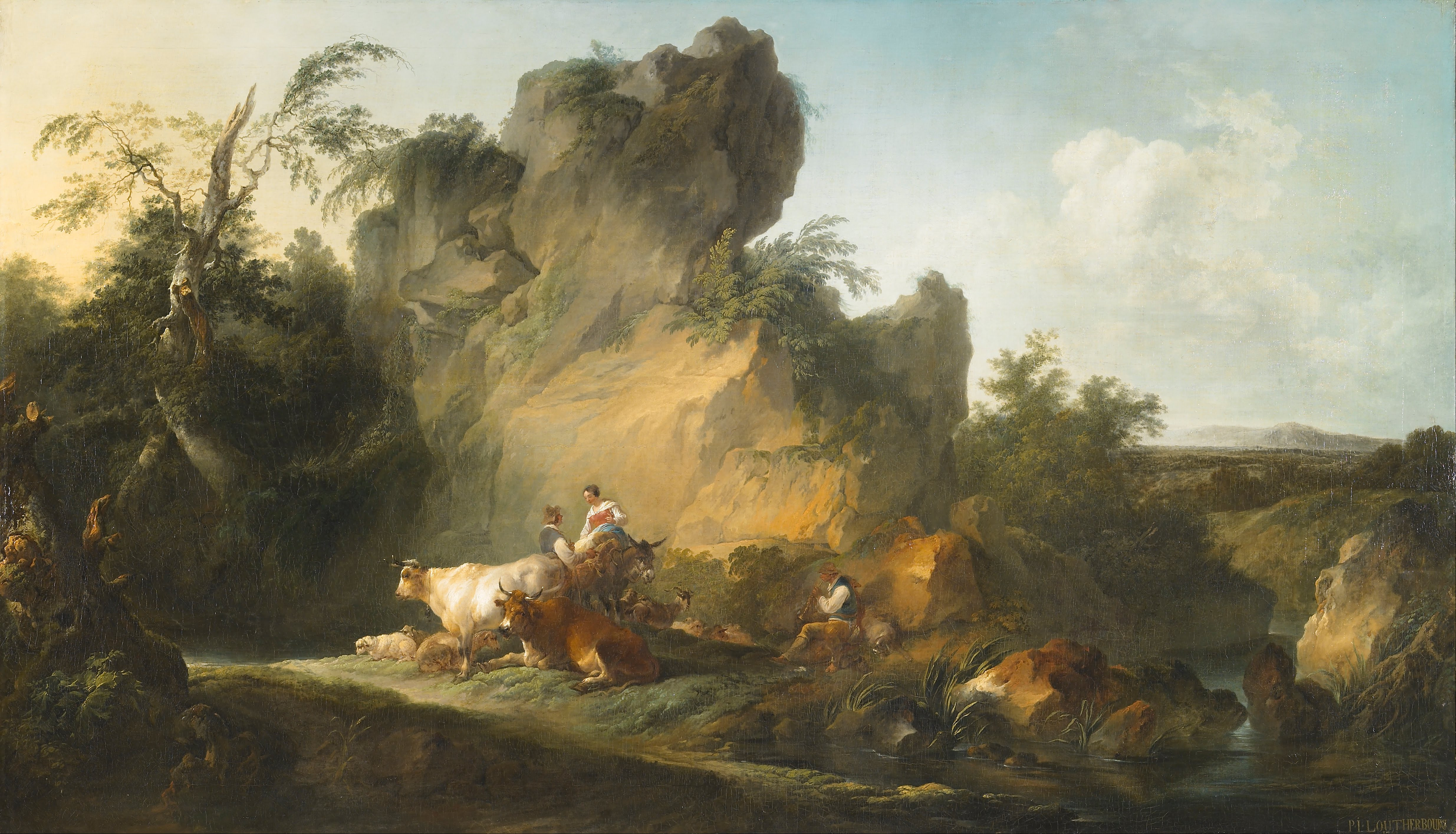
- Artist: Philip James de Loutherbourg
- Year: 1763
- Type: Oil on canvas, landscape painting
- Dimensions: 114 cm × 194 cm (45 in × 76 in)
- Location: Walker Art Gallery, Liverpool

Landscape with Figures and Animals is an oil on canvas landscape painting by the French artist Philip James de Loutherbourg, from 1763. It was the first painting the young Alsatian artist publicly exhibited. He submitted it to the Salon of 1763 at the Louvre in Paris where the art critic Denis Diderot's praise of it helped launch his career. Today it is in the collection of the Walker Art Gallery in Liverpool. Loutherbourg subsequently emigrated to London where he became a pioneering painter of the emerging romantic movement.

== Bibliography ==
- Monks, Sarah, Barrell, John & Hallett, Mark (ed.) Living with the Royal Academy: Artistic Ideals and Experiences in England, 1768-1848. Ashgate, 2013.
- Murray, Christopher John. Encyclopedia of the Romantic Era, 1760-1850, Volume 2. Taylor & Francis, 2004.
- Preston, Lillian Elvira. Philippe Jacques de Loutherbourg: Eighteenth Century Romantic Artist and Scene Designer. University of Florida, 1977.
- Wright, Christopher, Gordon, Catherine May & Smith, Mary Peskett. British and Irish Paintings in Public Collections: An Index of British and Irish Oil Paintings by Artists Born Before 1870 in Public and Institutional Collections in the United Kingdom and Ireland.
