= The Little Park =

Painting by Jean-Honoré Fragonard

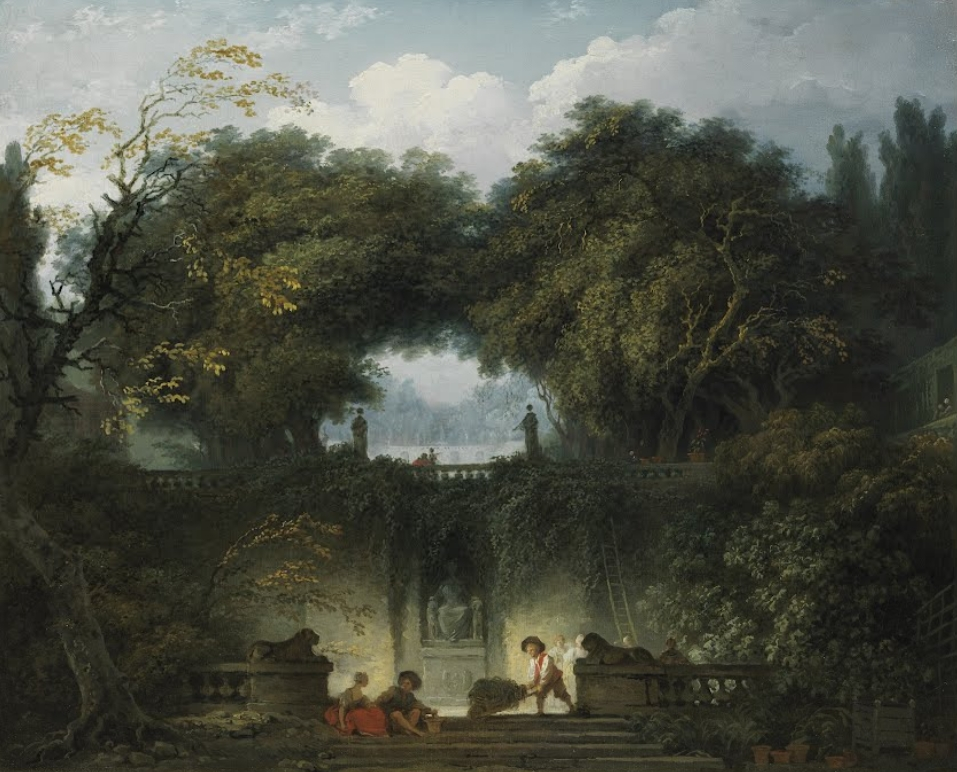
- Artist: Jean-Honoré Fragonard
- Year: c.1763
- Type: Oil on canvas, landscape painting
- Dimensions: 37 cm × 45 cm (15 in × 18 in)
- Location: Wallace Collection; London

The Little Park (French: Le Petit Parc) is a c.1763 landscape painting by the French artist Jean-Honoré Fragonard. It features a view of the gardens of the Villa d'Este in Tivoli near Rome. Having won the Prix de Rome Fragonard spent a number of years at the French Academy in Rome. This painting was based on sketches he had made in 1760 in the company of his friend Hubert Robert.

A pupil of François Boucher, Fragonard continued to paint in his mentor's rococo. Today the painting is in the Wallace Collection in London, having been acquired by Sir Richard Wallace in 1867.

== Bibliography ==
- Cuzin, Jean-Pierre . Jean-Honoré Fragonard: Life and Work. Abrams, 1988
- Lajer-Burcharth, Ewa . The Painter's Touch: Boucher, Chardin, Fragonard. Princeton University Press, 2018.
