= The Cricketers (West) =

Painting by Benjamin West

- Artist: Benjamin West
- Year: c 1763
- Type: Oil on canvas, portrait painting
- Dimensions: 99 cm × 125 cm (39 in × 49 in)
- Location: Private collection

The Cricketers is a 1763 oil painting by the Anglo-American artist Benjamin West. A conversation piece, it depicts a group of young colonial Americans from Pennsylvania, Virginia and South Carolina visiting the motherland to study. The background may be Kew Green with Kew Bridge. The painting shows the young men with cricket bats. It has been described as a depiction of the game of cricket emerging from its roots to become a national pastime played by the elite. In 2022 the British government placed an export ban on the work. The following year there were reports that Marylebone Cricket Club might acquired the painting for Lord's.

== Bibliography ==
- Alberts, Robert C. Benjamin West; A Biography. Houghton Mifflin, 1978
- Riess, Steven A. Sports in America from Colonial Times to the Twenty-First Century: An Encyclopedia. Taylor & Francis, 2015.
