= President Molé Confronted by Insurgents =

Painting by François-André Vincent

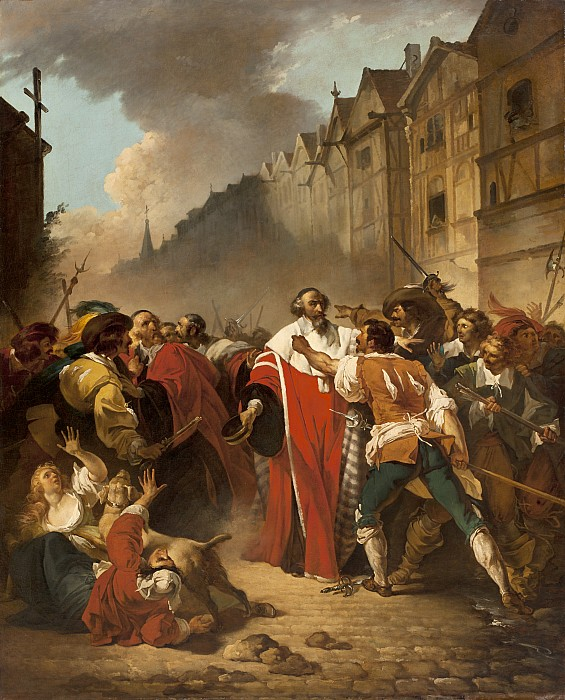
- Artist: François-André Vincent
- Year: 1779
- Type: Oil on canvas, history painting
- Dimensions: 325 cm × 325 cm (128 in × 128 in)
- Location: Palais Bourbon, Paris

President Molé Confronted by Insurgents (French: Le Président Molé, saisi par les factieux) is an oil on canvas history painting by the French artist François-André Vincent, from 1779.

== History and description ==
It depicts a moment in 1648 during the Fronde when the statesman Mathieu Molé was confronted by an angry mob in the streets of Paris.

Vincent has benefited from the appointment of the Count of Angiviller as Louis XVI's director of culture. He immediately launched a state-driven campaign to promote patronage of French art, particularly encouraging younger painters such a Vincent. Recently made a provisional member of the Académie Royale, the commission was a prestigious one for the rising artist. It represented a move towards depicting scenes from French history as well as the more traditional classical era.

The painting marked a great success for Vincent when it was exhibited at the Salon of 1779 at the Louvre. The painting officially belongs to the Louvre but since 1860 has hung at the Palais Bourbon in the city, which houses the National Assembly. A smaller version is now in the collection of the Detroit Institute of Arts.

== See also ==
- Admiral Coligny Confronts His Assassins, a 1787 painting by Joseph-Benoît Suvée which drew inspiration from this work

== Bibliography ==
- Crow, Thomas E. Painters and Public Life in Eighteenth-century Paris. Yale University Press, 1985.
- Mansfield, Elizabeth C. The Perfect Foil: François-André Vincent and the Revolution in French Painting. University of Minnesota Press, 2011.
