= Musée des Beaux-Arts de Caen =

Art museum in Caen, Normandy, France

Musée des beaux-arts de Caen
- Established: 1801
- Location: Château de Caen
- Coordinates: 49.1861004°N 0.3614867°W
- Type: Art museum
- Website: www.mba.caen.fr

The Musée des Beaux-Arts de Caen is a fine arts museum in the French city of Caen, founded at the start of the 19th century and rebuilt in 1971 within the ducal château.

== History ==
=== Opening ===
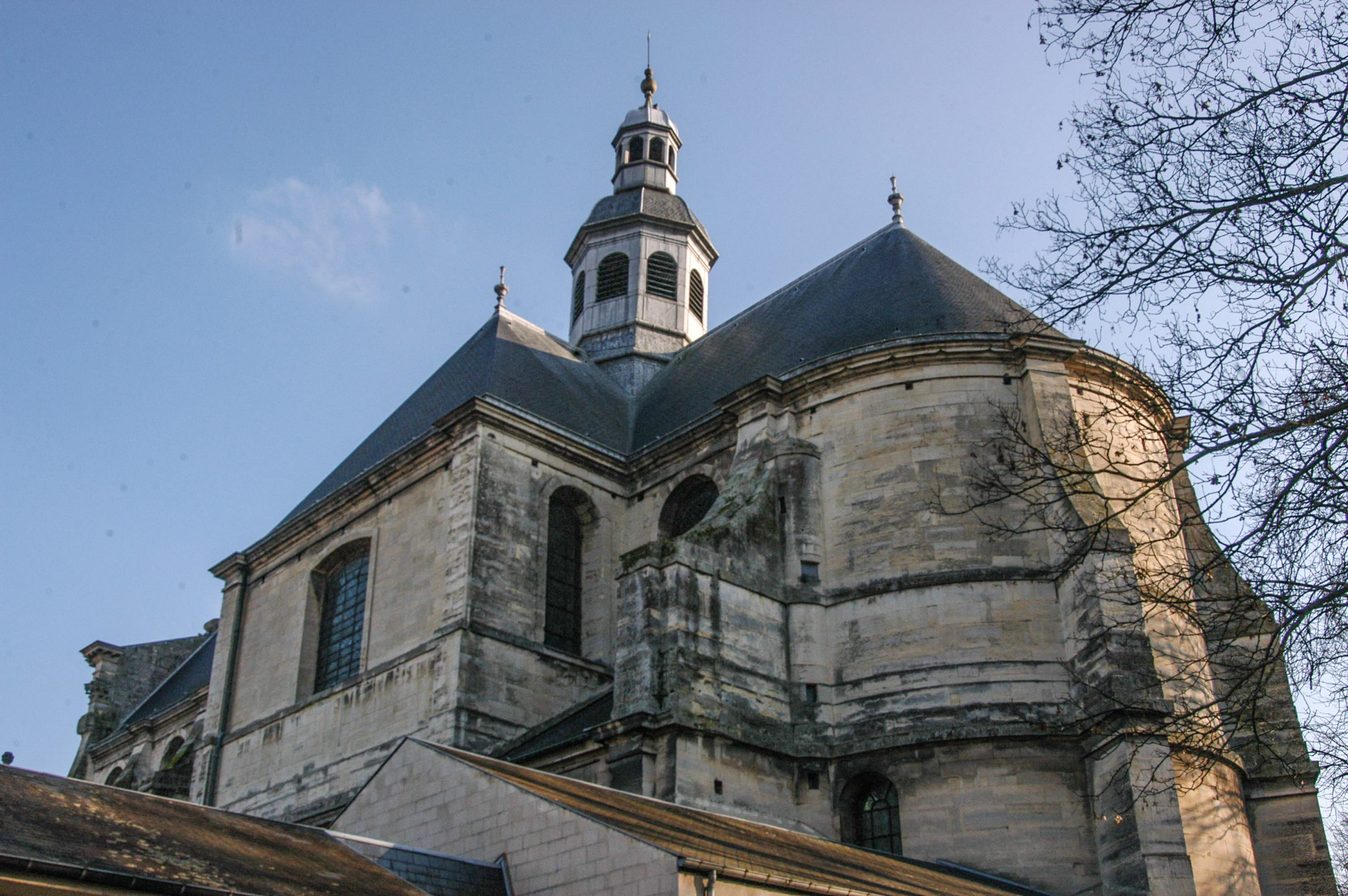
The Sainte-Catherine-des-Arts church.

On September 1, 1801, the Minister of Interior Jean-Antoine Chaptal selected 15 cities to serve as depots to display a large number of paintings confiscated from émigrés or acquired through the Revolutionary and Napoleonic Wars. Although the city of Caen was chosen for its academic reputation and character as cultural capital of Normandy, it showed, at first, little enthusiasm because article 4 of the Chaptal decree specified that "the paintings will be sent only after the town has effected the expense for a gallery suitable to receive them". The paintings removed from churches and religious communities during the Revolution having already been stockpiled in the Sainte-Catherine-des-Arts church, the mayor Daigremont St. Manvieux first thought of installing the museum in the former Jesuit church. But on October 27, 1801, the decision was finally made to use the left wing of the former Eudist seminary, already partly occupied by the mayoralty since 1792. On October 27, 1802, the prefect of Calvados asked for the title of museum commissioner to be conferred to François-Pierre Fleuriau, a highly ranked design instructor at the Central School of Calvados. To augment the already existing collections, the new curator selected, in 1804, 46 paintings by various artists (Veronese, Poussin,...). This made the Caen collections the largest ones after those of Lyon. The curator also expended the new collections, even trying, although unsuccessfully, to have the Bayeux Tapestry transferred to Caen.

The development work of the museum progressed very slowly. In 1806, the prefect Charles Ambroise de Caffarelli du Falga, disallowed the appropriations voted by the municipality for resumption of the work that had been interrupted. Only once the funds were released in the budget of 1809 could the project can be completed. In November 1809, the paintings that had been stored in the former Jesuit church were transferred and the museum was officially opened on December 2, 1809. The curator was also in charge of the municipal art school founded in 1804.

=== Development and first monographs ===
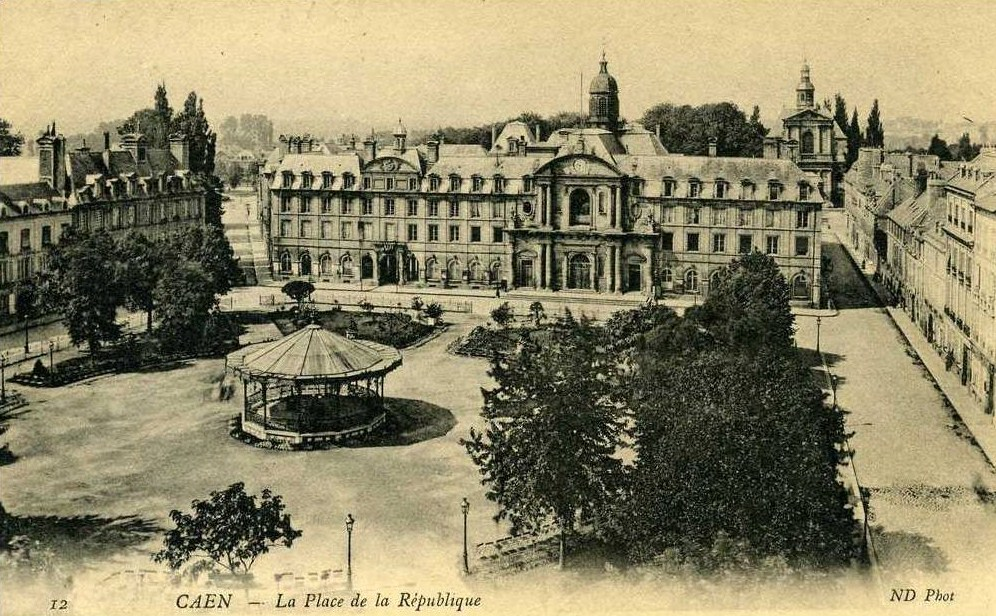
The old Eudist seminary.

Starting from 1811, the new curator, Henry Elouis augmented the collections, notably thanks to a new collection of 35 paintings attributed by the Ministry of the Interior. In 1815, the Prussians camped in the ground floor of the old Eudist seminary to force the surrender of paintings confiscated in Germany. Elouis then hid the most important paintings. According to legend, he hid in particular Abraham and Melchizedek by Rubens under the very dinner table used by Prussian officers. After the Prussians had left the city following the restitution of lesser paintings, Belgium then asked for the return of paintings by great Brussels masters, but the curator and mayor of Caen, the count of Vandœuvre, were able to stem the new crisis.

The second half of the nineteenth century was a calmer period that favored the study of collections. In 1837, Bernard Mancel wrote the first catalog, and the first monograph concerning to the collections was published in 1850. While the acquisition policy of Alfred Guillard, the successor of Elouis from 1841 to 1880, was rather uninspired, a series of bequests endowed the museum with a hundred additional artworks. The Baroness de Montaran's, which included three paintings by Boucher, twenty Gudin and one Mignard, was the most remarkable bequest of the second half of the nineteenth century.

The largest donation in the history of the museum was bequeathed in 1872 by the Caen bookseller Bernard Mancel, who had purchased in 1845 a large part of Cardinal Fesch, the uncle of Napoleon I in Rome's collection. The Mancel collection included more than 50,000 works: prints by Dürer, Rembrandt and Callot, and about thirty paintings by Perugino (The Marriage of the Virgin), Veronese (Temptation of St. Anthony) or Rogier van der Weyden (The Virgin and Child). A year later, the family of colonel Langlois bequeathed 256 paintings of battles and military views. These paintings were transferred in 1888 to the Pavillon des sociétés savantes, which had been remodeled at the expense of colonel Langlois' niece to house the museum.

=== Decline in prestige in the 1880s ===
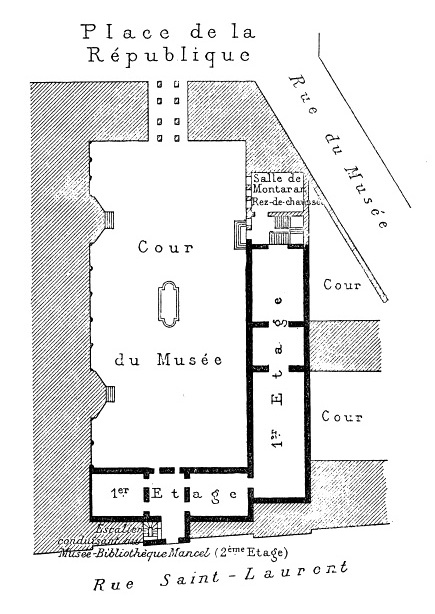
Map of the museum in 1893.

In 1880, the acquisition policy by the new curators, Xenophon Hellouin and Gustave Ménégoz, was uninspired, and the prestige of the museum waned. Under the influence of mayoralty of Caen, the curators acquired mostly regional works with exclusive local interest, now exhibited on the ground floor of the old Eudist seminary set up as a museum of Norman art and history. Donations became less frequent, and often consisted of minor works bequeathed more for ostentatious reasons than for the sake of art. Despite the bequest by the mayor Fervaques, Dr. Jacquette, of paintings by Courbet, Boudin and Lepine, modern, especially impressionist artwork remained virtually unrepresented at the museum.

While other cities built large museums to house their collections, the Caen museum remained cramped in a wing of City Hall. The structure was in a precarious state and on November 3, 1905, part of the collections went up in flames. Several works from the Dutch and Flemish schools were lost as well as The Battle of Hastings by François Debon. Partly because it represented the Norman victory over the English during a context of high international tension, partly because of its romantic design, this particular painting enjoyed a certain popularity, and the fire caused a scandal. Local and national newspapers called for museum reorganization. The town council then agreed on "the principle of the construction of a museum housed in a dedicated site in the conditions of security and lighting a museum as wealthy as ours is entitled to ask for". The councilors planned on organizing a lottery to build a new museum on the terrace of the Place de la Prefecture (now Place Gambetta), but the idea was quickly abandoned and the museum remains in a precarious state.

=== Destruction in 1944 ===
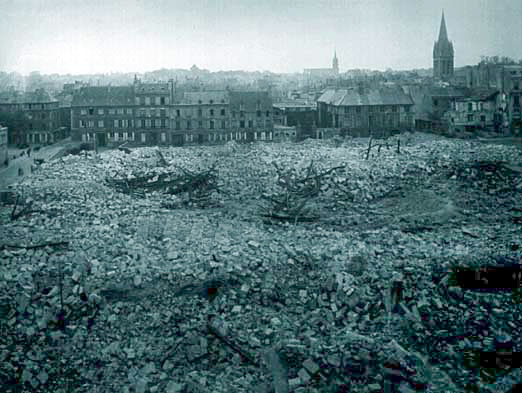
The site of the museum after 1944.

In 1934, Louis-Edouard Garrido was appointed as curator. From 1936, he undertook a restoration of the museum and improved the lighting of the works. When his work was interrupted by the war in 1939, 360 paintings, the collection Mancel, the Bernard van Riesen Burgh chest and other artifacts were transferred to the priory of Saint-Gabriel, the abbey of Mondaye and the castle of Baillou. The collections went largely unharmed through Nazi occupation when on June 7, 1944, the old seminary was mostly destroyed by the Allies. On July 7, the last Allied air raid flattened what was still left standing. 540 paintings (the nineteenth-century collections, and many anonymous seventeenth-century works), the 400 drawings of the cabinet of drawings, archives, inventories, and frames were lost forever. Much of the Langlois museum was bombed too, and half of the exhibited works were lost as well.

=== Rebirth in 1971 ===
The surviving works were hastily stored in the unsound ruins of the hotel Escoville and the Langlois museum. In 1963, it became possible again to think about rebuilding the museum. Collections were inventoried and, in addition to the Mancel collection, 567 paintings and miniatures, ceramics and porcelain were identified. 1971 saw the inauguration of the new museum built by Jean Merlet in the castle of Caen. Meanwhile, Francoise Debaisieux, the new curator embarked on an ambitious acquisition policy, focusing on the seventeenth-century French, Italian and Flemish schools. Her policy was sustained by the Louvre depots. In 1982, the museum was promoted to the rank of "musée classé", in recognition of the importance of the collections and the vitality of the policy that enriched them. In 1988, Francoise Debaisieux was succeeded by Alain Tapie who organized major exhibitions and added in 1994 a new wing built by Philippe Dubois. The new curator expanded the collections by acquiring contemporary works. Following this extension, the Ministry of Culture presented the museum with the Grand Prix National des Musées in 1995, in recognition for its architecture and program. Since 2007, the museum had been at the center of the Parc des Sculptures, housed in the castle, at the initiative of Patrick Ramade, chief curator, and museum director since 2004.

Starting on February 1, 2005, access to permanent exhibitions was made free of charge in order to democratize access to culture. The museum has also diversified its cultural stance by organizing workshops for younger audiences and adults. The museum also accommodates, since 1997, Les Cyclopes, a Baroque musical ensemble that gives an annual series of concerts in conjunction with the institution's cultural programming. Likewise, Michel Onfray's Université populaire de Caen holds some of its seminars at the museum.

== Collections ==
The museum offers 64,583 square feet (6,000.0 m^{2}) of space dedicated to the public collections with many works of Italian and Flemish, as well as French Renaissance, and of contemporary art. The prints from the Mancel collection are presented in a 400-m^{2} room. The museum is equipped with a conference room seating 230, used notably by the Université populaire de Caen. Finally, the curatorial library, comprising over 20,000 art history volumes, is open to the public.

=== Paintings destroyed in 1944 ===
- Jacques-Antoine Beaufort (1721–1784), The Death of Calamus or Calamus Going up the Stake in the Presence of Alexander, Salon of 1779.

=== 14th to 16th century ===
Author	Work	Date	Type	Dimension	Image
Barnaba da Modena	Crucifixion with the Virgin and St. John	Between 1361 and 1383	Wood with cut sections	0.675 × 0.640	
Cosme Tura	Saint Jacques		Panel	75.1 × 40.9	
Perugino	Saint Jerome in the Desert	Vers 1499–1502	Panel	89.3 × 72.5	
id.	The Marriage of the Virgin (or Sposalizio)	Between 1500 and 1504	Panel	236 × 186	nothumb
Cima da Conegliano	The Virgin and Child with Saint George and Saint Jacques	c. 1510 – 1511	Triptych on panel. transposed on canvas	137 × 61 (central panel) and 121 × 44.5 (side panels)	
Andrea del Sarto	Saint Sebastian holding two arrows and the palm of martyrdom		Wood (poplar)	0.839 × 0.680	
Taddeo Zuccari	The Beheading of St. John the Baptist	1555–1560	Canvas	66 × 51	
Rogier van der Weyden	The Virgin and Child		Panel	51.5 × 33.5	
Pieter Brueghel the Younger	The Payment of tithing (or The Numbering in Bethlehem)		Panel	110 × 160	nothumb
Master de Hoogstraten	The Virgin and Child with Saint Catherine. Saint Madeleine and Saint Barbara	1510	Wood (oak)	78.8 × 71	
Frans Floris	Portrait of elderly woman (or The falconer's wife)		Panel	107.7 × 83.4	
Paris Bordone	Annunciation	1545–1550	Canvas	102 × 196	
Lambert Sustris	The Baptism of Christ	Vers 1543	Canvas	129.4 × 236.1	
Tintoretto	The Descent from the Cross	1556–1558	Canvas	135.6 × 102	nothumb
id.	The Last Supper	1564–1566	Canvas	90 × 121	
Paolo Veronese	The Temptation of St. Anthony	1552	Canvas	198.2 × 149.5	
id.	Judith and Holofernes	After 1581	Canvas	231.5 × 273.5	
Benedetto Caliari	The Departure of the Israelites or the Israelites out of Egypt		Canvas	95 × 121	

=== 17th century ===
- L'Empoli, St. Clair taking the veil (c. 1620)
- Entourage of Carracci, Group of Artists (c. 1600)
- Giuseppe Cesari, The Victory of Tullus Hostilius on the Forces of Veies and Fidena (1596–1597)
- Bernardo Strozzi, Santa Rosalia
- Domenico Fetti, The Parable of the Prodigal Son and The Pricey Pearl
- Guercino, Coriolanus begged by his mother (1643)
- Andrea Sacchi, Didon abandoned or Didon on the pyre (c. 1630 – 1635)
- Novelli, Musical Duel of Apollo and Marsyas
- Attributed to Francesco Cairo, Head of St. John the Baptist
- Giovanni Benedetto Castiglione, Io
- Salvator Rosa, Glaucus and Scylla
- Bernardo Cavallino, The Immaculate Conception (c. 1640)
- Giuseppe Nuvolone, Samson and Delilah
- Valerio Castello, Simon the Magician (c. 1650 – 1656)
- Erasmus Quellinus (II), Virgin Mary with Saint Hubert and Saint Nicholas of Tollentine (1669)
- Giacomo Cotta, The Flight to Egypt or The rest of the Holy Family (1673)
- Luca Giordano, The Abduction of Helen (between 1680 et 1683)
- Attributed to Pietro Negri, Mercury and Argus
- Andrea Pozzo, The Guardian Angel (c. 1685 – 1694)
- Giandomenico Tiepolo, Ecce Homo (c. 1760 – 1770)
- Simon Vouet, The Virgin and Child with Angel (1636) and Young Man and the fig (between 1620 and 1630)
- Claude Vignon, Portrait of a Young Man (c. 1615 – 1618)
- Nicolas Poussin, Venus mourning Adonis (c. 1625)
- Philippe de Champaigne, The Annunciation (1633), The Vow of Louis XIII (1638) and The Samaritan Woman (1648)
- Laurent de La Hyre, The Apparition of the Virgin and Child in the Heaven (c. 1630) and Theseus finding the Weapons of his Father (1634)
- Lubin Baugin, St. Jerome
- Attributed to Jean Daret, The Savior of the world
- Sébastien Bourdon, Christ and the Centurion (1655–1660)
- Charles Le Brun, Charity (c. 1642–1648)
- Jean-Baptiste Belin de Fontenay, Flowers in a Vase on a Carved Entablature and Woman with a Garland of Flowers
- Peter Paul Rubens, Abraham and Melchissedech (between 1615 and 1618)
- Frans Snyders, Intérieur d'office (c. 1635)
- Attributed to Artus Wolffort, St. Jerome (c. 1630)
- Abraham Govaerts, Hunting Landscape of Meleager and Atalanta
- Gérard Seghers & Frans Ykens, The Virgin and Child Jesus in a Garland of Flowers
- Jacob Jordaens, Study Head: Abraham Grapheus
- Shop of Anthony van Dyck, Communion of St. Bonaventure (1628–1632)
- Nicolaes van Verendael, Vanity (c. 1680)
- Gérard de Lairesse, The Conversion of St. Augustine (c. 1663)
- Bertholet Flemalle, Adoration of the Shepherds (c. 1665)
- Jan Davidsz de Heem, Vanity (1628)
- Harmen van Steenwyck, Peasants in an Interior
- Jan Asselijn, Landscape with Watermill
- Thomas Wyck, The Alchemist's Lab
- Willem Drost, The Oyster Sheller
- Johannes Moreelse, Mary Magdalene Penitent
- Willem van Aelst, Bouquet of Flowers (1651)
- Jacob van Walscapelle, Still life of flowers and insects

=== 18th century ===
Author	Work	Date	Type	Dimension	Image
Anonyme d'après Jean Jouvenet	Saint Peter curing the sick	vers 1700	Canvas		
Hyacinthe Rigaud	Portrait of Mary Cadene	1684	Canvas	139 × 102	nothumb
Hyacinthe Rigaud	Supposed Portrait of the Comte de Gacé		Canvas	136 × 113	
Jean-Baptiste Oudry	Sow and piglets attacked by dogs	1748	Canvas	258 × 400	
Robert Tournières	Portrait of Goldsmith Nicolas Delaunay and his family	c. 1705	Canvas	56 × 70.2	
Jean Restout	Portrait of a Premonstratensian	c. 1725 – 1735	Canvas	81 × 65.5	
Pierre Subleyras	Portrait of Countess Mahony	c. 1740 – 1745	Canvas	100 × 74.5	
Giovanni Paolo Pannini	Prince Vaini Being Awarded the Order of the Holy Spirit by the Duc de Saint-Aignan		Canvas		
François Boucher	Pastoral (or Young Shepherd in a Landscape)		Canvas	89 × 121.5	nothumb
Hubert	Portrait of an elderly woman	1779	Canvas	231.5 × 273.5	
Firmin Perlin	Death of Jacques Clinchamps de Malfilâtre				nothumb
Blaise Nicholas Le Sueur	Solomon Before the Ark of the Covenant	1747	Canvas	96 × 127	

=== 19th century ===
Author	Work	Date	Type	Dimension	Image
Eugène Delacroix	Quentin Durward and Scarface	c. 1828 – 1829	Canvas	40.5 × 32.4	nothumb
Eugène Isabey	Sailors leaving the port of Saint-Valery		Canvas	40.5 × 61	nothumb
Théodore Chassériau	Group of Arabs (or Joseph sold by his brothers)		Canvas	82 × 66	nothumb
Gustave Courbet	The Sea	1871–1872	Canvas	38 × 45	nothumb
id.	Lady with the Jewels	1867	Canvas	81 × 64	nothumb
Théodore Rousseau	Landscape		Canvas	82.6 × 124.8	nothumb
Jean-Baptiste-Camille Corot	The Goat-herders of Castel Gandolfo	1866	Canvas	59 × 78	nothumb
Eugène Boudin	The Beach of Deauville	1863	Canvas	50.5 × 74.5	nothumb
id.	Pasture in Fervaques	1874	Canvas	55 × 38	nothumb
Gustave Doré	Scottish Landscape	1881	Canvas	92 × 165	

=== 20th century ===
- Balthus, Langouste
- Pierre Bonnard, Portrait of Madame Henri Jean Arthur Fontaine
- Georges Braque, The Chair (on loan from the State)
- Olivier Debré, Black Blue Loire Ocher with Top Strong Stains
- François Dilasser, Planet
- Jean Dubuffet, Migration
- Albert Gleizes, Composition
- František Kupka
- Jean Metzinger, The Card Drawer
- Joan Mitchell, Fields and The Sky Is Blue, The Grass Is Green
- Ernest Pignon-Ernest, David and Goliath
- Pierre Soulage, Painting June 7, 1974
- Mark Tobey, Appearances
- Kees van Dongen, Portrait of Marie-Therese Raulet
- Jacques Villon, Scribe
- Édouard Vuillard, Portrait of Suzanne Desprez

=== Parc des sculptures ===
- Antoine Bourdelle, Grand Warrior (on loan from the Musée Bourdelle)
- Damien Cabanes, Untitled (on loan from the Fonds national d'art contemporain)
- Huang Yong Ping, One Man, nine animals (on loan from the Fonds national d'art contemporain)
- Marta Pan, Sphère coupée 1400-1000 (on loan from the Fonds national d'art contemporain)
- Auguste Rodin, La Grande Ombre (on loan from the musée Rodin)
- Jaume Plensa, Lou (bought by the city in 2022)
- François Morellet, Un angle de vue pour trois arcs (musée des Beaux-Arts)

== Nazi-looted art ==
In 1998 a Nazi-looted Monet was discovered among the artworks on temporary loan to the Museum of Fine Arts in Boston, causing an uproar. Waterlilies (1904) had been looted from the Rosenberg family in 1940. It was restituted in 1999.
