= Charles Claude Flahaut, Count of Angiviller =

French politician (1730–1809)

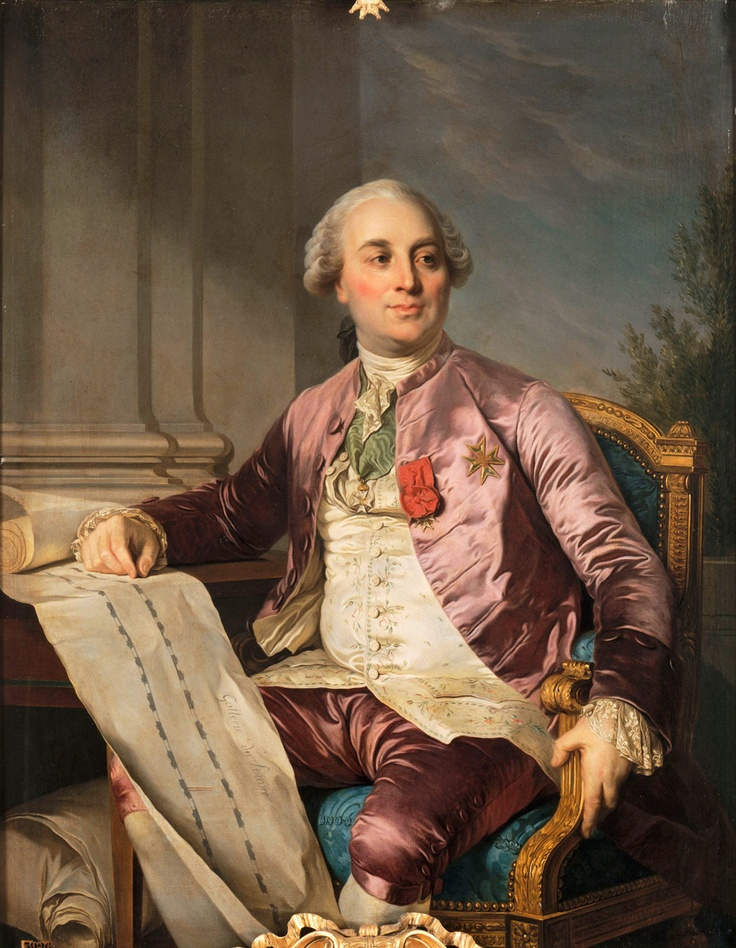
Portrait of the Count of Angiviller by Joseph Duplessis, 1779

Charles Claude Flahaut, Count of Angiviller (1730–1809) was the director of the Bâtiments du Roi, a forerunner of a minister of fine arts in charge of the royal building works, under Louis XVI, from 1775. Through Flahaut, virtually all official artistic patronage flowed.

His portrait by Joseph Duplessis, exhibited at the Salon of 1779, is conserved in the Louvre.

In 1784, he was elected a member of the American Philosophical Society.

After the French Revolution he was accused of mishandling public property and emigrated, settling in Hamburg, where he died in 1809.
