= Jacques-Antoine Beaufort =

French painter

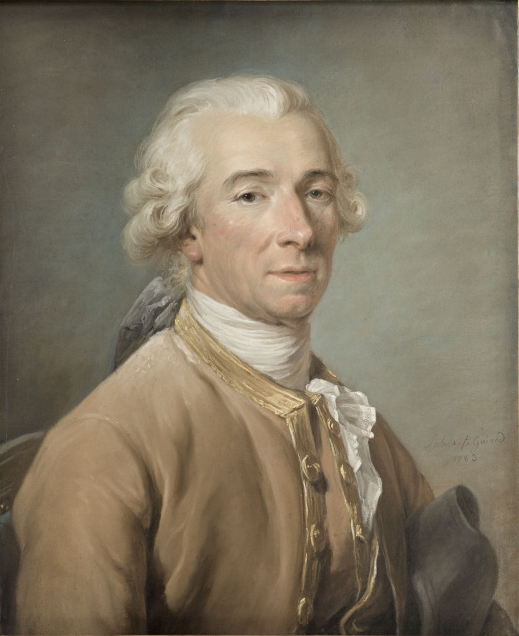
Portrait by Adélaïde Labille-Guiard, 1783

Jacques Antoine Beaufort (1721 in Paris – 1784 in Rueil), was an 18th-century academic French painter. Little is known of his early life but he had his first public exhibition at the Marseille Academy in 1756, where he taught drawing, and later at the Paris Salon (1767–83). He was accepted into the Academie Royale in 1766.

== Works ==
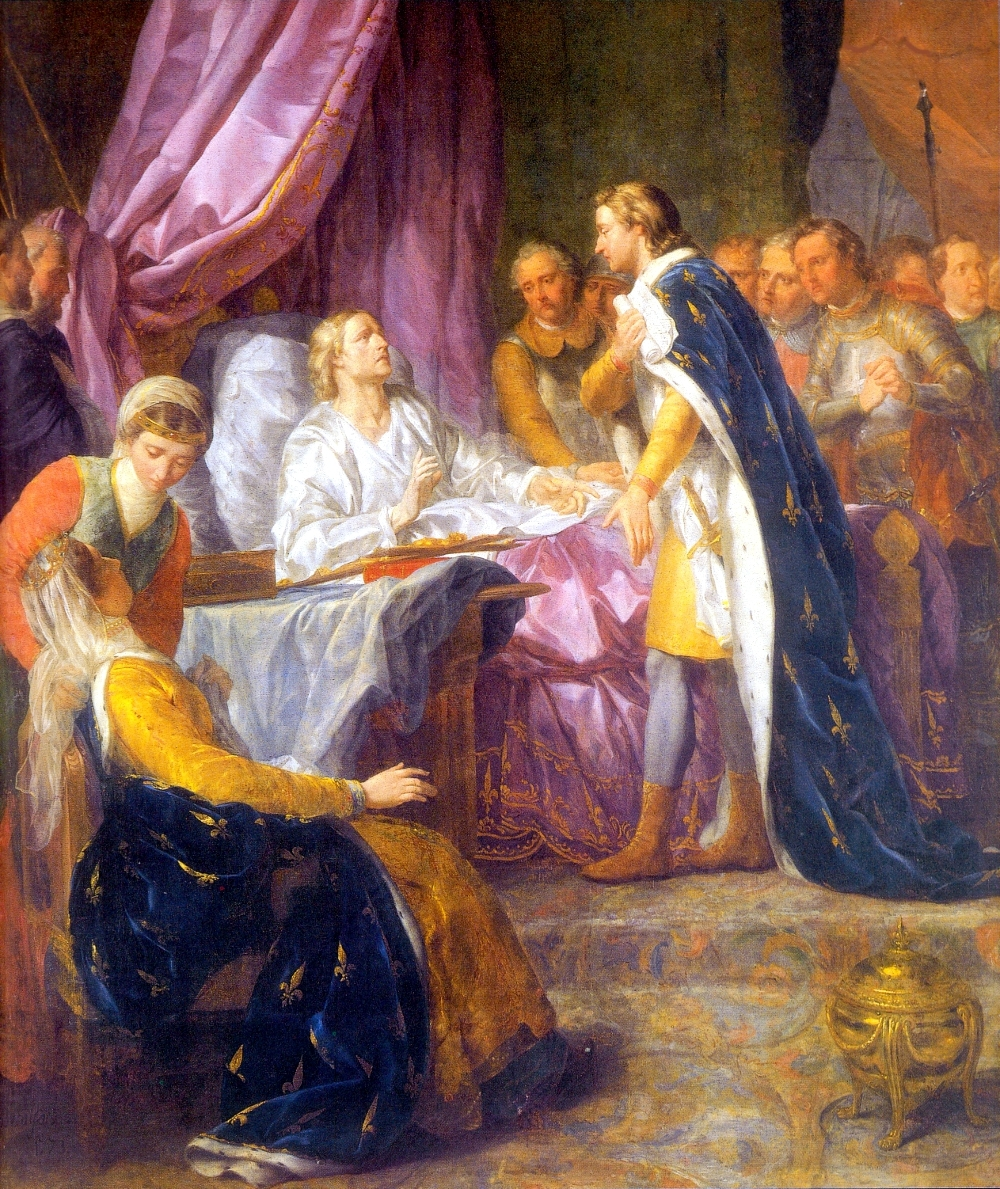
Saint Louis, King of France, on his deathbed, giving his last advice to his son Philippe, by Jacques-Antoine Beaufort

His best known painting is the Oath of Brutus to avenge Lucretia (Salon of 1771). Other works include Roman Charity (Salon of 1777). The Death of Calamus in the Presence of Alexander (Salon of 1779) which was in the Musée des Beaux-Arts de Caen was destroyed in World War II (1944).
