= Louis-Édouard Garrido =

French painter

Louis-Édouard Garrido (1893–1982) was a French painter.

== Biography ==
Louis-Édouard Garrido was a French painter, the son of Spanish artist Leon Eduardo Garrido. Established in Normandy, Louis-Édouard Garrido painted superb landscapes in the area of Saint-Vaast, as well as portraits and still lifes. The artist has been the director of the Beaux Arts school of Caen (Normandy), as well as the curator of the Musée des beaux-arts in Caen. Louis Edouard Garrido was also the president of the artist association of Lower Normandy.

== Artworks ==
- the Port of St.Vaast-la-Hougue
- Nature morte aux groseilles (still-life with berries)
- Autoportrait au chapeau (self-portrait with hat)

== Sources ==
- Official website of the City of St-Vaast
