= Portrait of the Comte d'Angiviller =

Painting by Joseph Duplessis

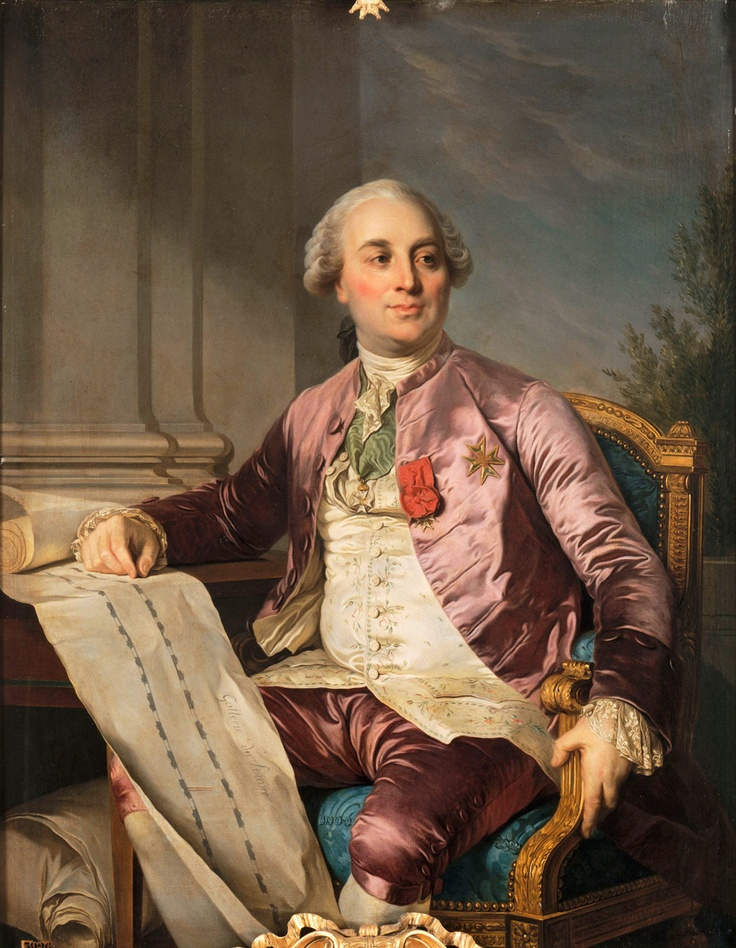
- Artist: Joseph Duplessis
- Year: 1779
- Type: Oil on canvas, portrait painting
- Dimensions: 144 cm × 106 cm (57 in × 42 in)
- Location: Palace of Versailles; Versailles

Portrait of the Comte d'Angiviller is a 1779 portrait painting by the French artist Joseph Duplessis. It depicts the public official and aristocrat Charles Claude Flahaut, Count of Angiviller who as director of the Bâtiments du Roi during the reign of Louis XVI wielded great influence over the art world. He is shown holding the plans for Grande Galerie of the Louvre in Paris which he advocated turning into a museum.

The painting was commissioned by the king for 2,000 livres and was exhibited at the Salon of 1779 at the Louvre. The original is now in the Musée Condé in Chantilly, while a second version is in the Museum of French History at the Palace of Versailles.

== Bibliography ==
- Feigenbaum, Gail & Reist, Inge Jackson. Provenance: An Alternate History of Art. Getty Research Institute, 2012.
- Hargrove, June Ellen. The Statues of Paris: An Open-air Pantheon : The History of Statues to Great Men. Mercatorfonds, 1989.
- Levey, Michael. Painting and Sculpture in France, 1700-1789. Yale University Press, 1993.
