= Mathieu Molé =

French statesman

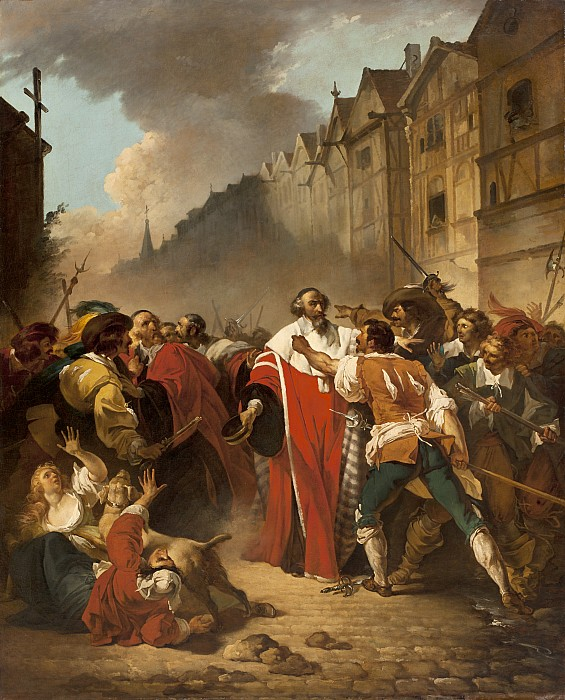
President Molé Confronted by Insurgents, Mathieu Molé (1584-1656), French statesman, and rebels, by François-André Vincent, 1779

Mathieu Molé (1584 – 3 January 1656) was a French statesman.

== Biography ==
The son of Edouard Molé (d. 1614), who was for a time procureur-général, he was educated at the University of Orléans. Admitted conseiller in 1606, he was président aux requêtes in 1610, procureur-général in succession to Nicolas de Bellièvre in 1614, and took part in the assembly of the Notables summoned at Rouen in 1617. He fought in vain against the setting up of special tribunals, or commissions, to try prisoners charged with political offences, and for his persistence in the case of the brothers Louis and Michel de Marillac he was suspended in 1631, and ordered to appear at Fontainebleau in his own defence.

Hitherto Molé's relations with Cardinal Richelieu had been fairly good, but his inclination to the doctrines of Port Royal increased the differences between them. It was not until after Richelieu's death that he was able to secure the release of his friend, the abbé de St Cyran. In 1641 he was appointed first president of the parlement, with the preliminary condition that he should not permit the general assembly of the chambers except by express order of the king. After Richelieu's death the pretensions of the parlement increased; the hereditary magistrature arrogated to itself the functions of the states-general, and in 1648 the parlement with the other sovereign courts (the cour des aides, the grand conseil, and the cour des comptes) met in one assembly and proposed for the royal sanction twenty-seven articles, which amounted in substance to a new constitution.

In the long conflict between Anne of Austria and the parlement, Molé, without yielding the rights of the parlement, played a conciliatory part. In the popular tumult known as the day of the barricades (26 August 1648) he sought out Mazarin and the queen to demand the release of Pierre Broussel and his colleagues, whose seizure had been the original cause of the outbreak. Next day the parlement marched in procession to repeat Molé's demand. On their way back they were stopped by the crowd. Molé was threatened with death unless he brought back Broussel or Mazarin as a hostage. Many magistrates fled; the remnant, headed by the intrepid Molé, returned to the Palais Royal, where Anne of Austria was induced to release the prisoners.

Molé's moderating counsels failed to prevent the outbreak of the first Fronde, but he negotiated the peace of Rueil in 1651, and averted a conflict between the partisans of Condé and of the Cardinal de Retz within the precincts of the Palais de Justice. He refused honours and rewards for himself or his family, but became keeper of the seals, in which capacity he was compelled to follow the court, and he therefore retired from the presidency of the parlement.

The Mémoires of Molé were edited for the Société de l'histoire de France (4 vols., 1855) by Aimé Champollion-Figeac, and his life was written by Baron AGP de Barante in Le Parlement et la Fronde (1859). See also the memoirs of Omer Talon and of De Retz.
