= The Meeting Between Abraham and Melchizedek (Rubens) =

Painting by Peter Paul Rubens

The Meeting between Abraham and Melchizedek
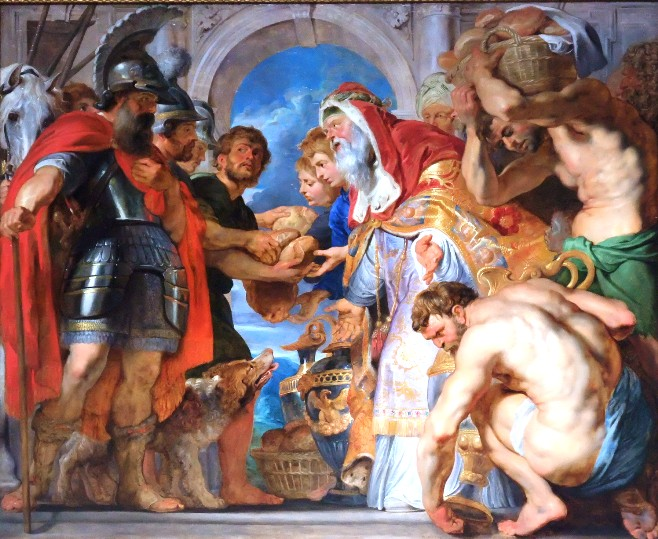
- Artist: Peter Paul Rubens
- Year: 1616-1617
- Medium: Oil on canvas
- Dimensions: 204 cm × 250 cm (80 in × 98 in)
- Location: Musée des Beaux-Arts; Caen

The Meeting between Abraham and Melchizedek is a 1616-17 painting by Peter Paul Rubens, showing the meeting between Abraham and Melchizedek as recounted in the Genesis 14. It measures 204 cm by 250 cm and is now in the Musée des Beaux-Arts de Caen.

The painting's origins are unknown. It belonged to the Du Bois family when, at the end of 1749, it was bought for William VIII, Landgrave of Hesse-Kassel by an art dealer in Antwerp for 6,000 florins. From that date onwards it was considered as a pendant to The Crowning of the Virtuous Hero in the inventory of the Kassel gallery. Both paintings were confiscated in 1806 by Vivant Denon and sent to Paris. Meeting was retained for the museum at Caen in 1811. After the fall of Napoleon, the Elector of Hesse sent a delegation in 1815 to recover it, though Élouis (curator of the Caen museum) pretended to be unable to find it. The Germans left disappointed, but continued trying to reclaim the painting until 1830.
