= Jacques Clinchamps de Malfilâtre =

French poet

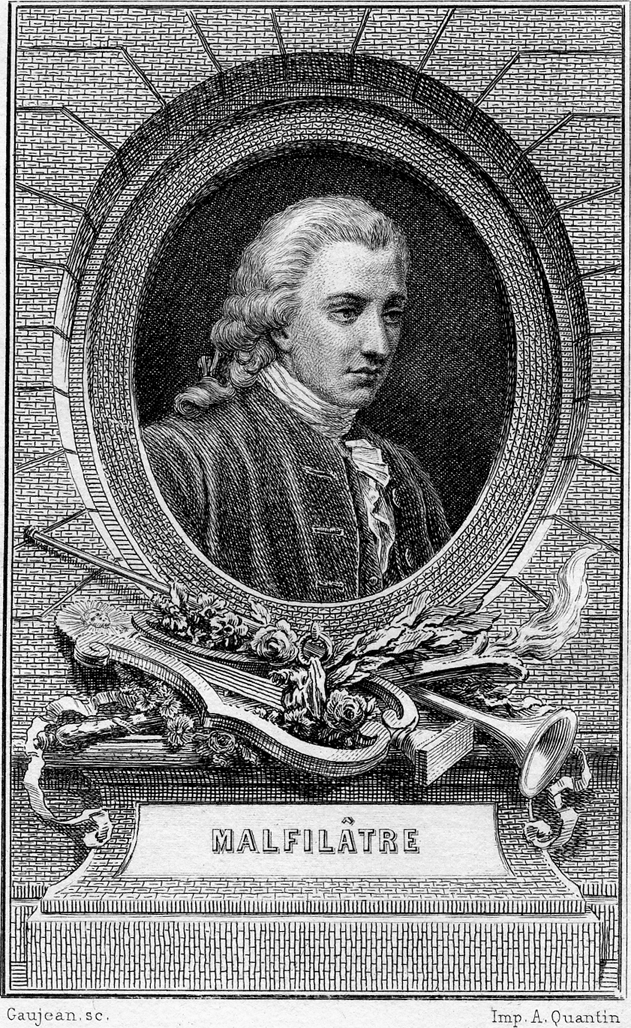
Jacques Clinchamps de Malfilâtre

Jacques Clinchamps de Malfilâtre (8 October 1732 – 6 March 1767) was a French poet.

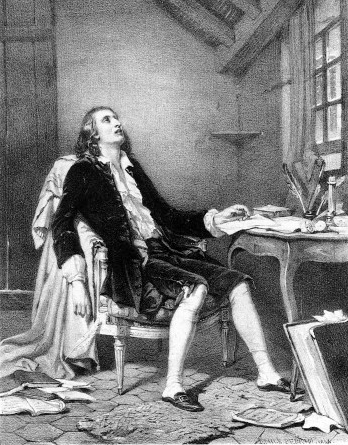
La Mort de Malfilâtre after a portrait by Firmin Perlin, Musée des Beaux-Arts de Caen

== Works ==
- Le Soleil fixe au milieu des planètes, 1759
- Narcisse dans l’île de Vénus, 1769 (poem in 4 chants, published posthumously)
- Le Bonheur
- Le Génie de Virgile Paris, Maradan, 1810
