= Salon of 1779 =

1779 art exhibition in Paris

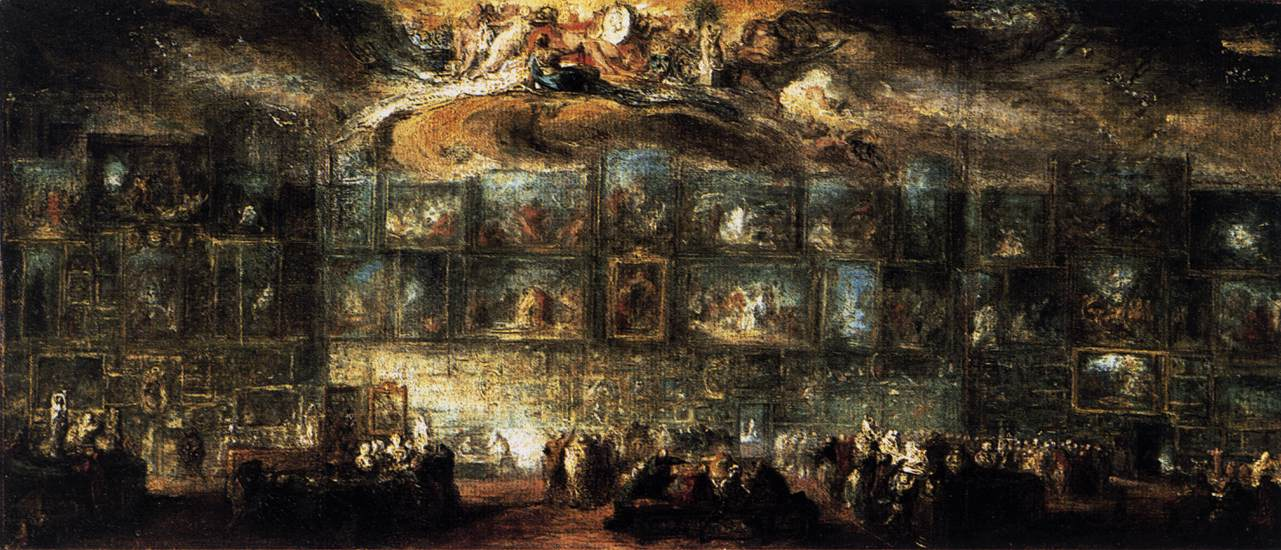
View of Salon of 1779 by Gabriel de Saint-Aubin

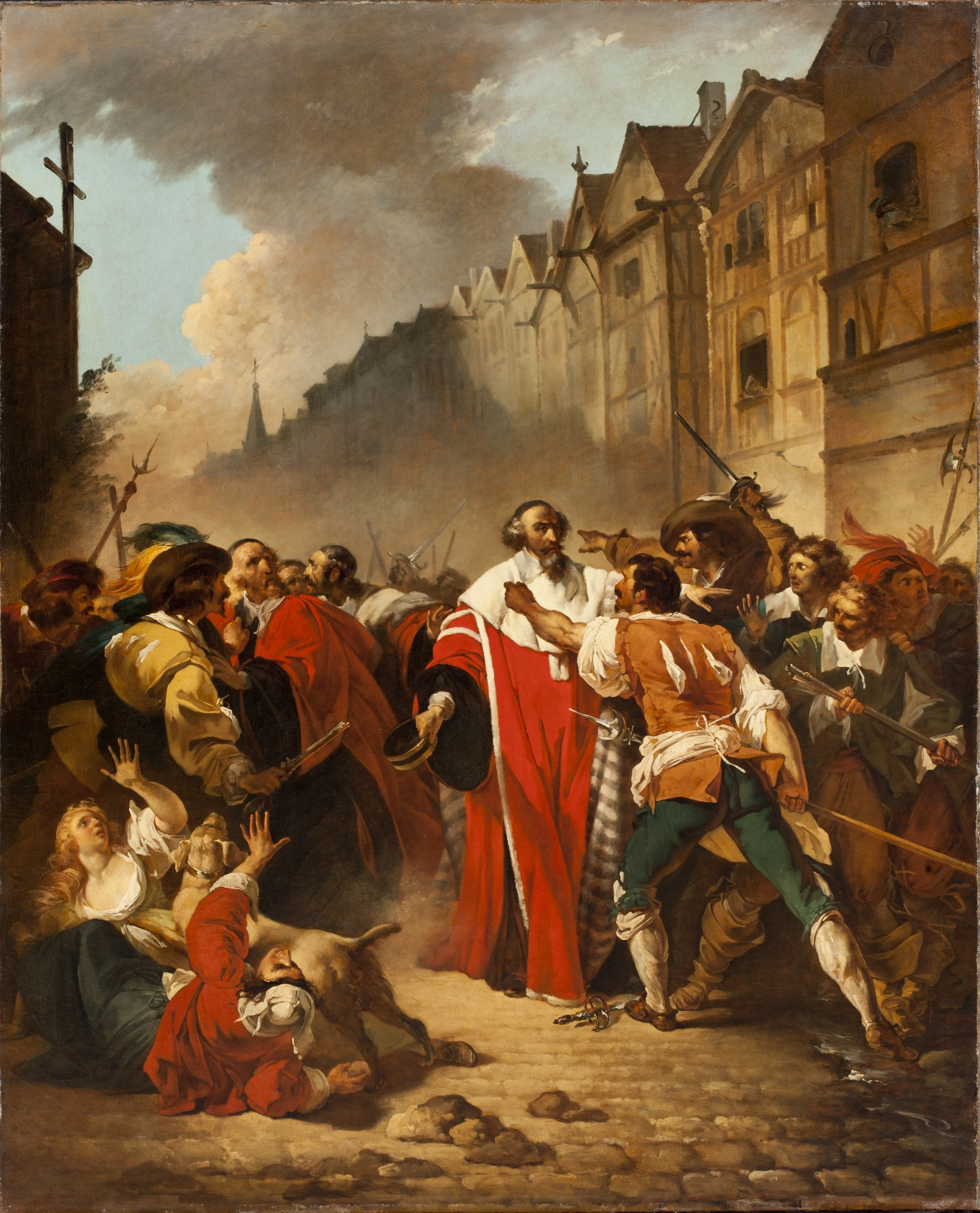
President Mole Manhandled by Insurgents by François-André Vincent

The Salon of 1779 was an art exhibition held at the Louvre in Paris. Part of the regular series of Salons organised by the Académie Royale, it ran from 25 August to 3 October 1779. Held during the reign of Louis XVI it featured submissions from leading painters, sculptors and architects of the Ancien régime. It took place while France was at war, having entered the American War of Independence against Britain the previous year. France and its ally Spain attempted to invade Britain with the unsuccessful Armada of 1779.

François-André Vincent enjoyed success with his history painting President Mole Manhandled by Insurgents, depicting a scene from the Fronde. Vincent was a noted painter of the Neoclassical style and a rival of Jacques-Louis David, then still living in Rome. Neoclassicism had by this stage largely displaced rococo. Vincent and David's mentor Joseph-Marie Vien sent a painting from Italy where he was director of the French Academy in Rome. Noël Hallé displayed Agesilaus of Sparta With His Children. Nicolas-Guy Brenet's Metellus Saved by His Son features a scene from Ancient Rome where Augustus spared an enemy following the Battle of Actium. Brenet also produced the now lost Cincinnatus Made Dictator.

In portraiture Joseph Duplessis displayed a picture of Benjamin Franklin, the well-known American Ambassador to the Court of Versailles. Franklin cultivated an image of a plain-dressed American, which this portrait reflects. It become the iconic image of Franklin, which Duplessis returned to a number of times. Duplessis also exhibited a portrait of the Count of Provence, who would later become king following the Bourbon Restoration. In addition was his Portrait of the Portrait of the Comte d'Angiviller whose position as director of the Bâtiments du Roi, made him the effective minister of culture.

Jacques-Antoine Beaufort's The Death of Calamus featured a scene with Alexander the Great, commissioned by Louis XVI. Destroyed during the Second World War, a preparatory oil sketch survives and is in the Prado in Madrid. Jean Siméon Chardin exhibited at the Salon for the last time, where his painting Un Jacquet was admired by Victoire of France. In sculpture Pierre Julien displayed his statue Dying Gladiator. Jean-Antoine Houdon produced a bust of Benjamin Franklin, that had drawn intrigued visitors to his studio, as well others featuring Molière, Jean-Jacques Rousseau and Voltaire.

== Gallery ==
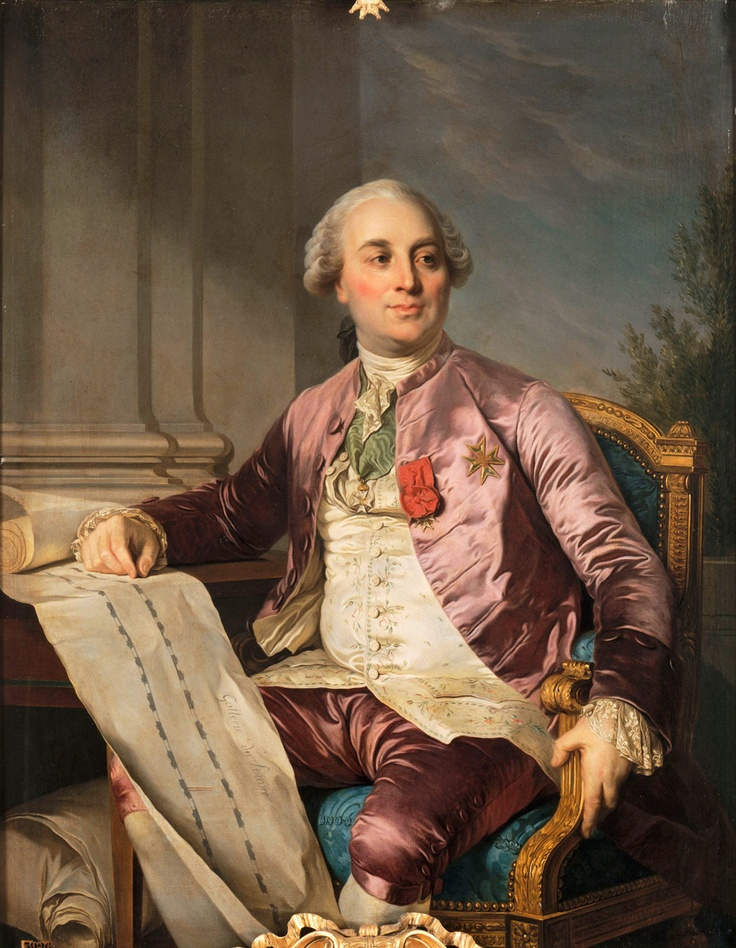
Portrait of the Comte d'Angiviller by Joseph Duplessis

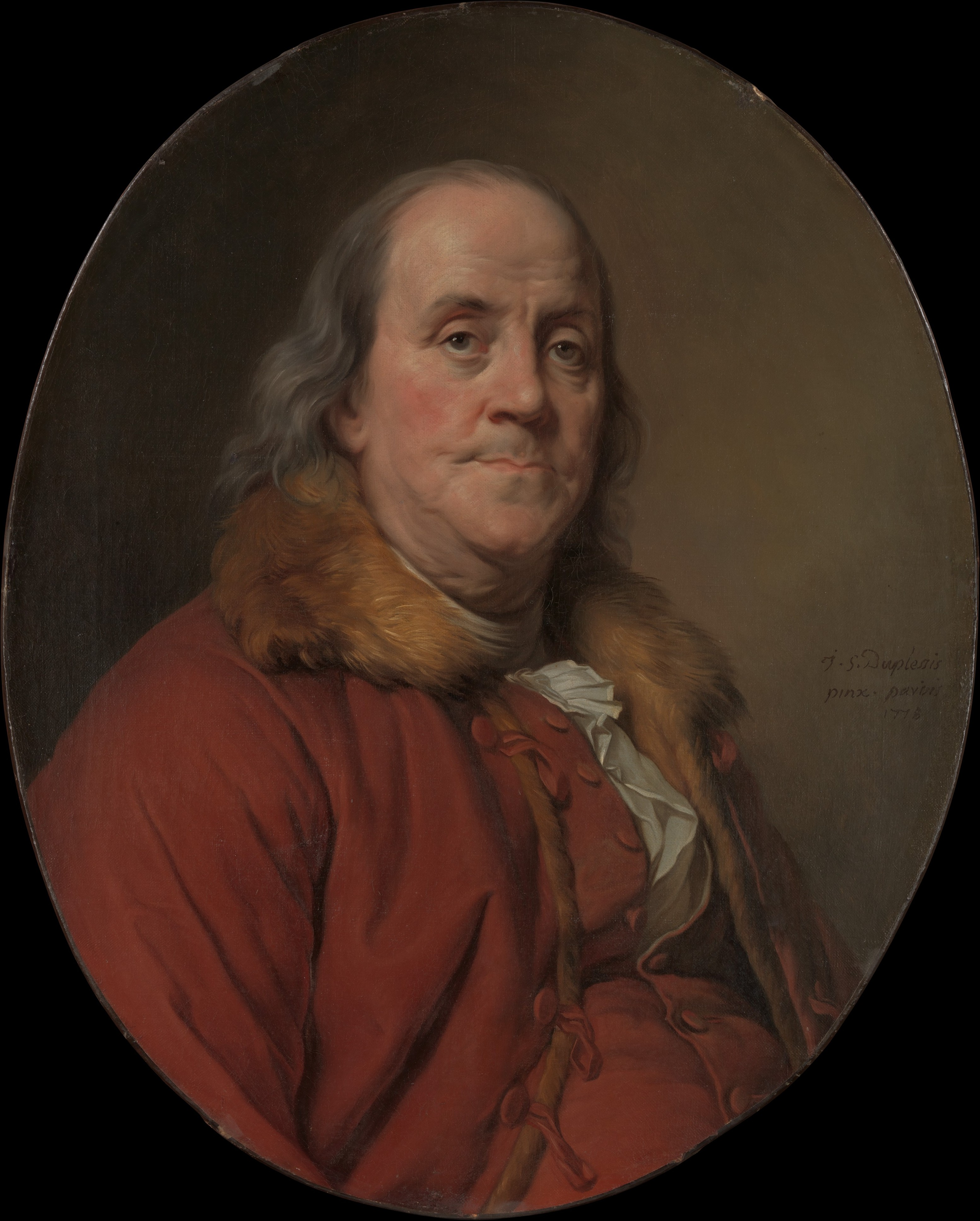
Portrait of Benjamin Franklin by Joseph Duplessis

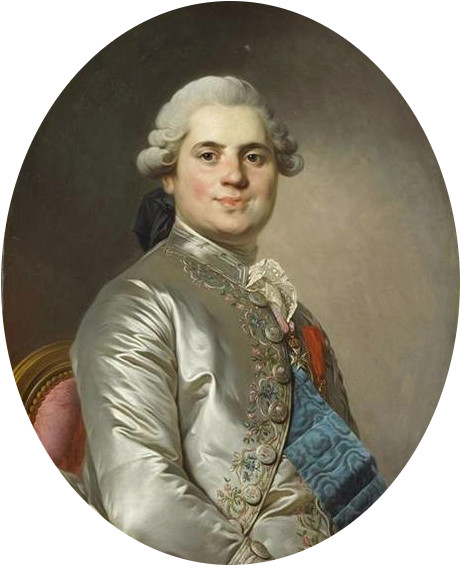
Portrait of the Count of Provence by Joseph Duplessis

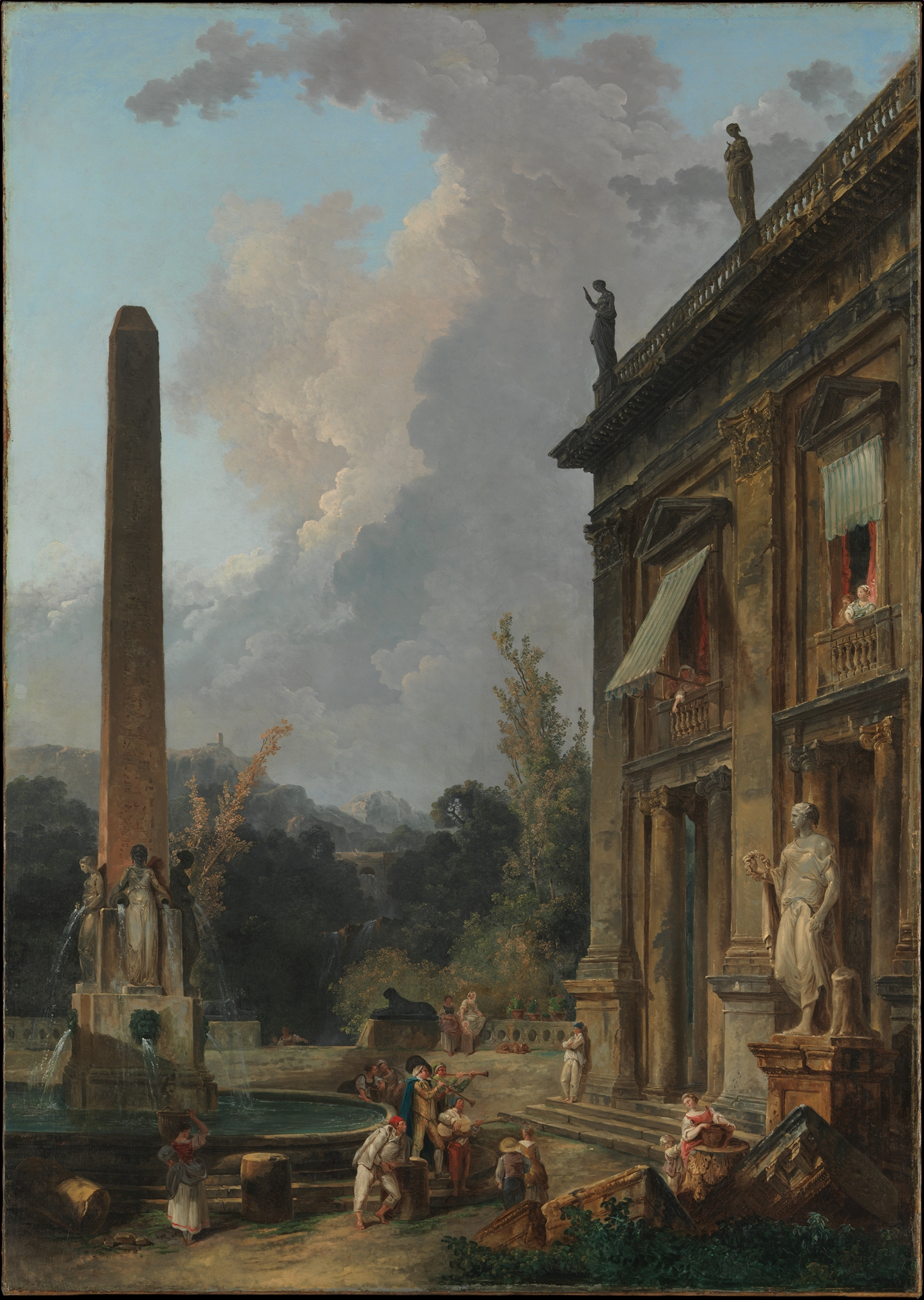
Wandering Minstrels by Hubert Robert

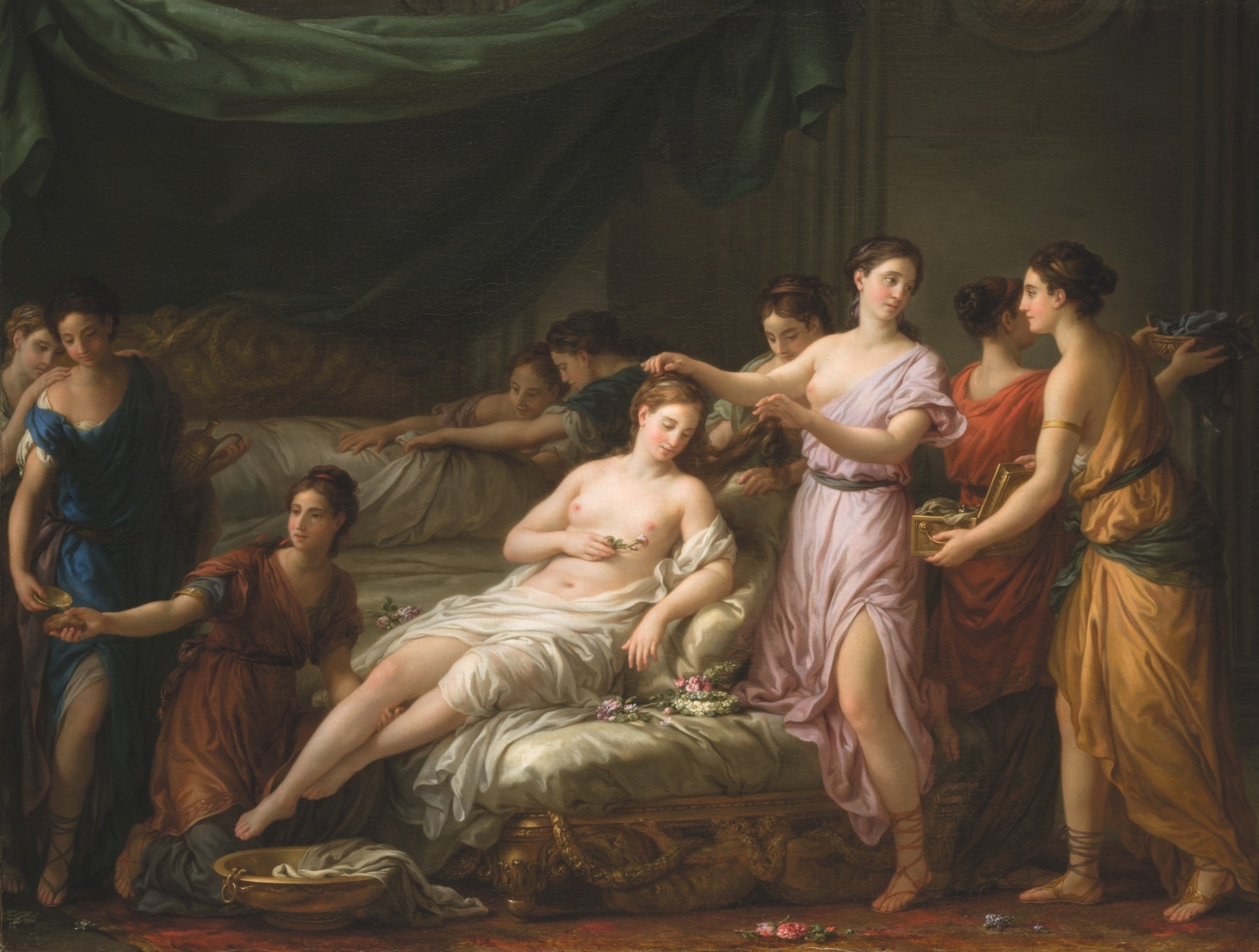
Women in Classical Dress Attending a Young Bride by Joseph-Marie Vien

The Interior of a Market by Nicolas Bernard Lépicié

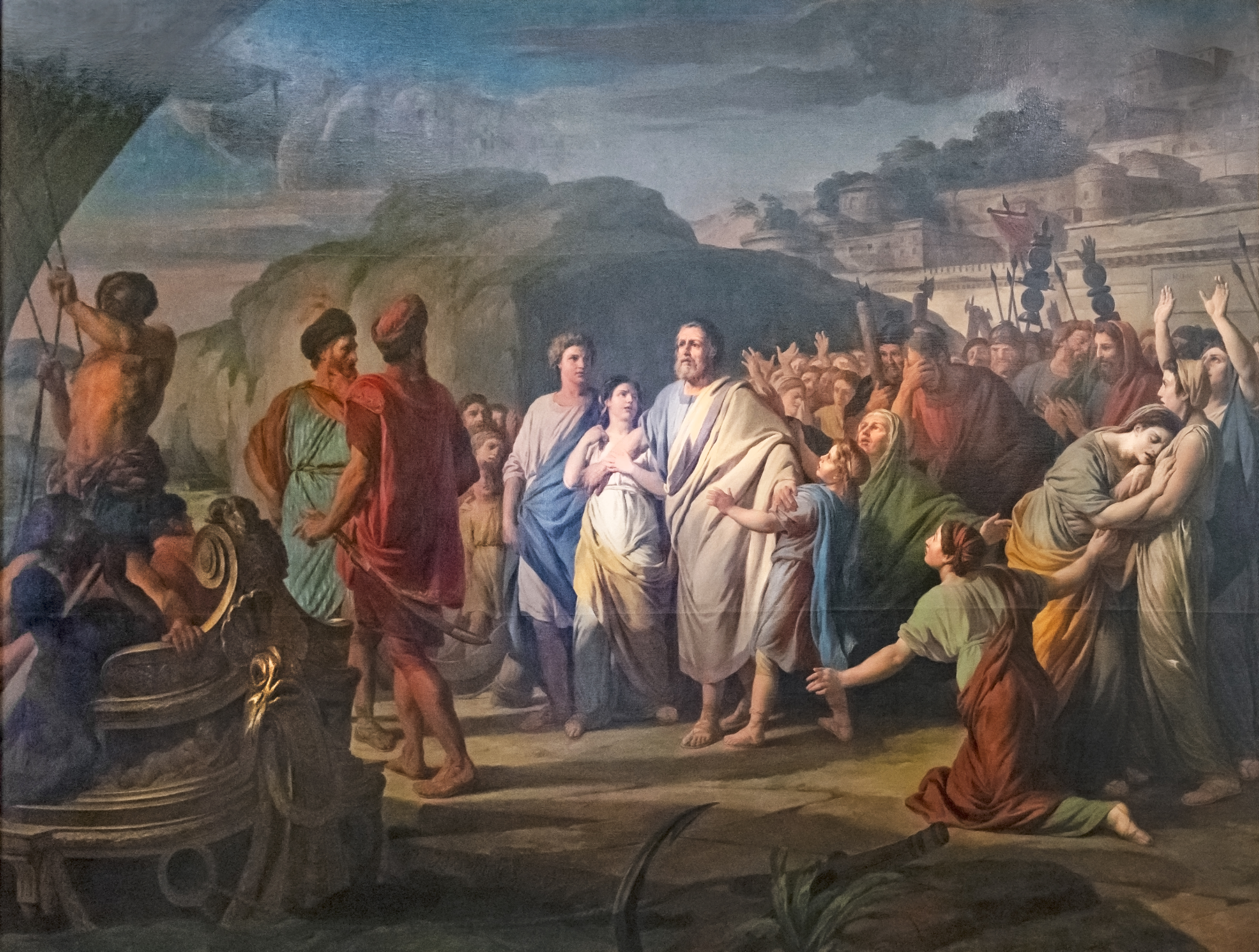
Regulus Returning to Carthage by Nicolas Bernard Lépicié

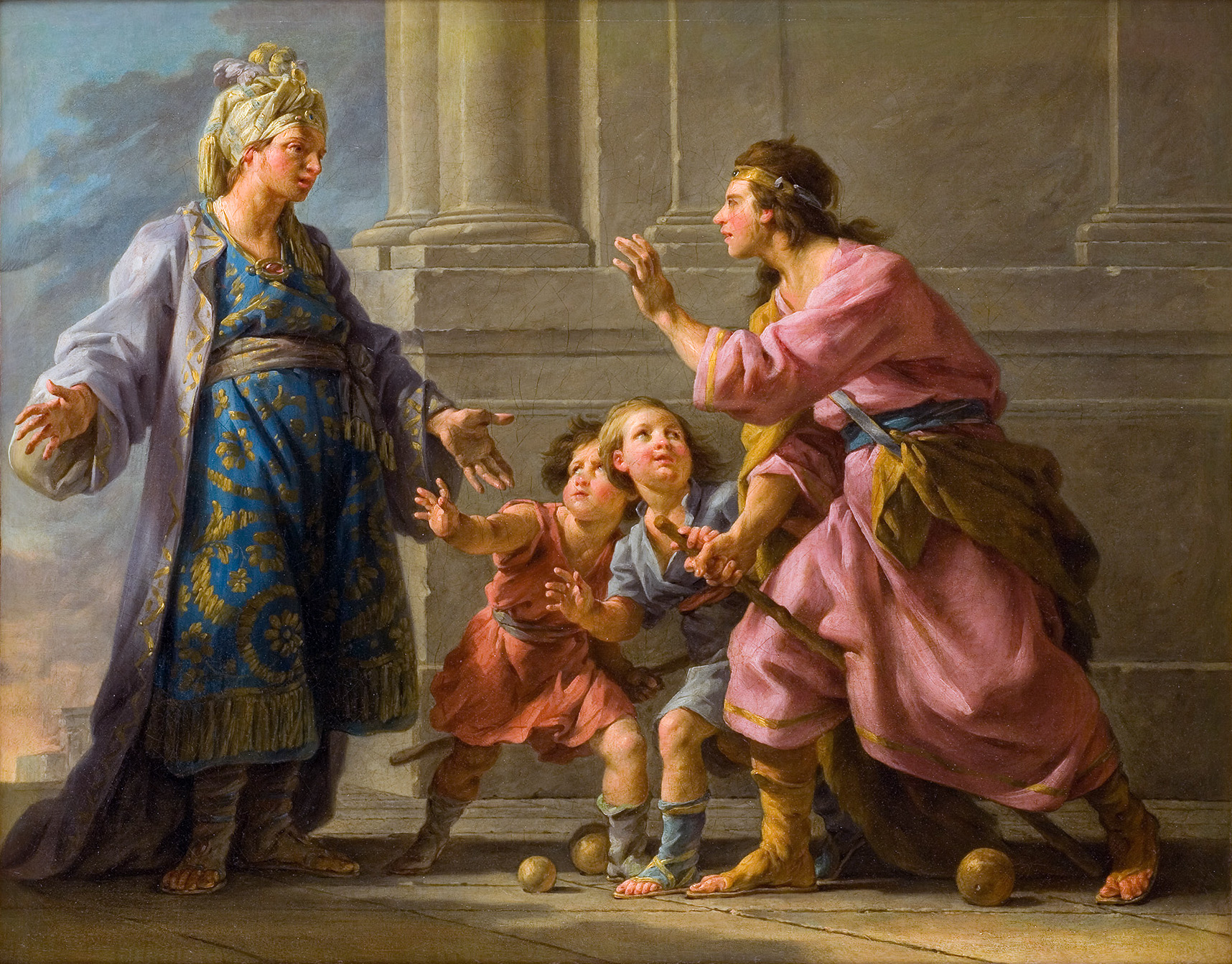
Agesilaus of Sparta With His Children by Noël Hallé

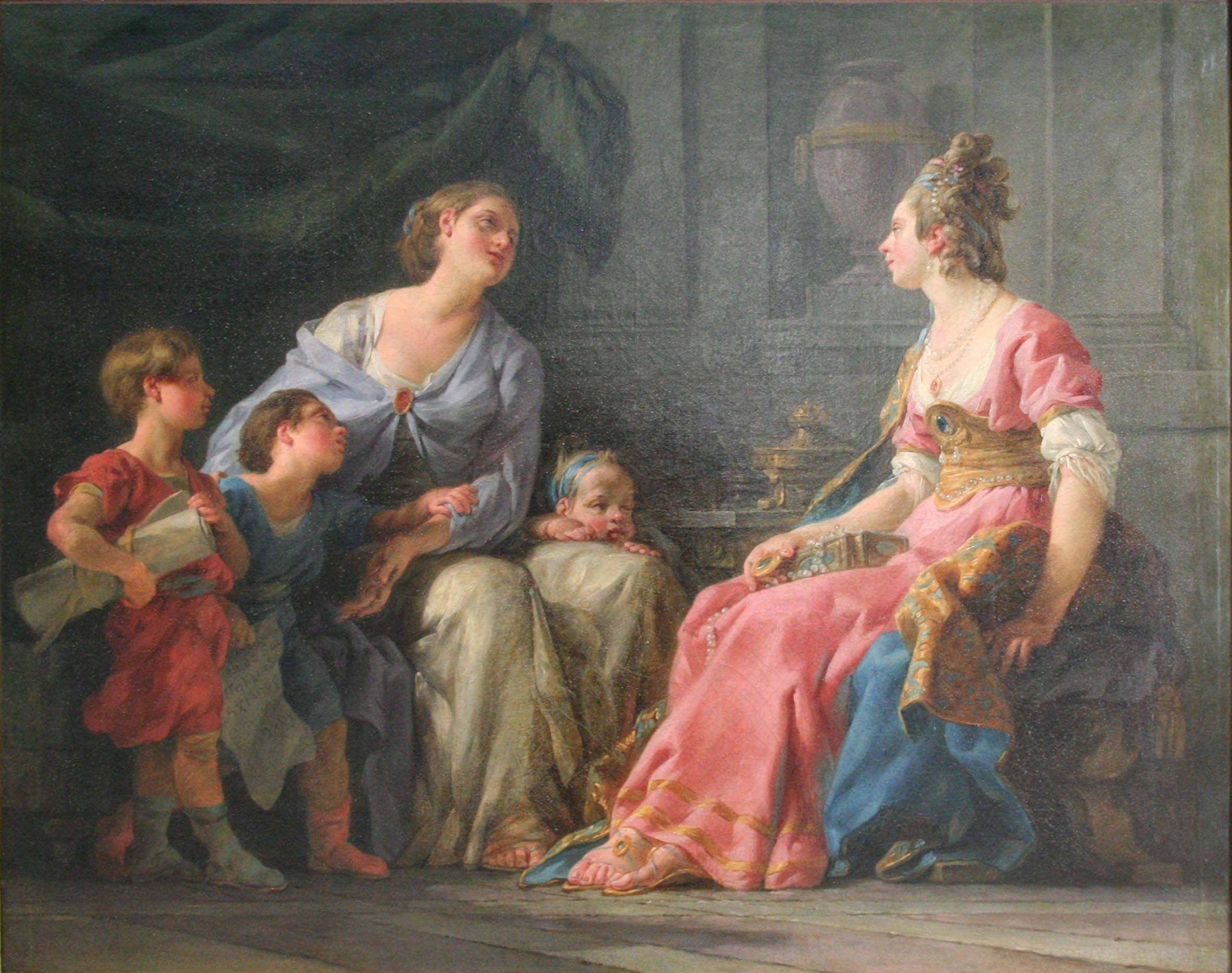
Cornélie, Mother of the Gracques by Noël Hallé

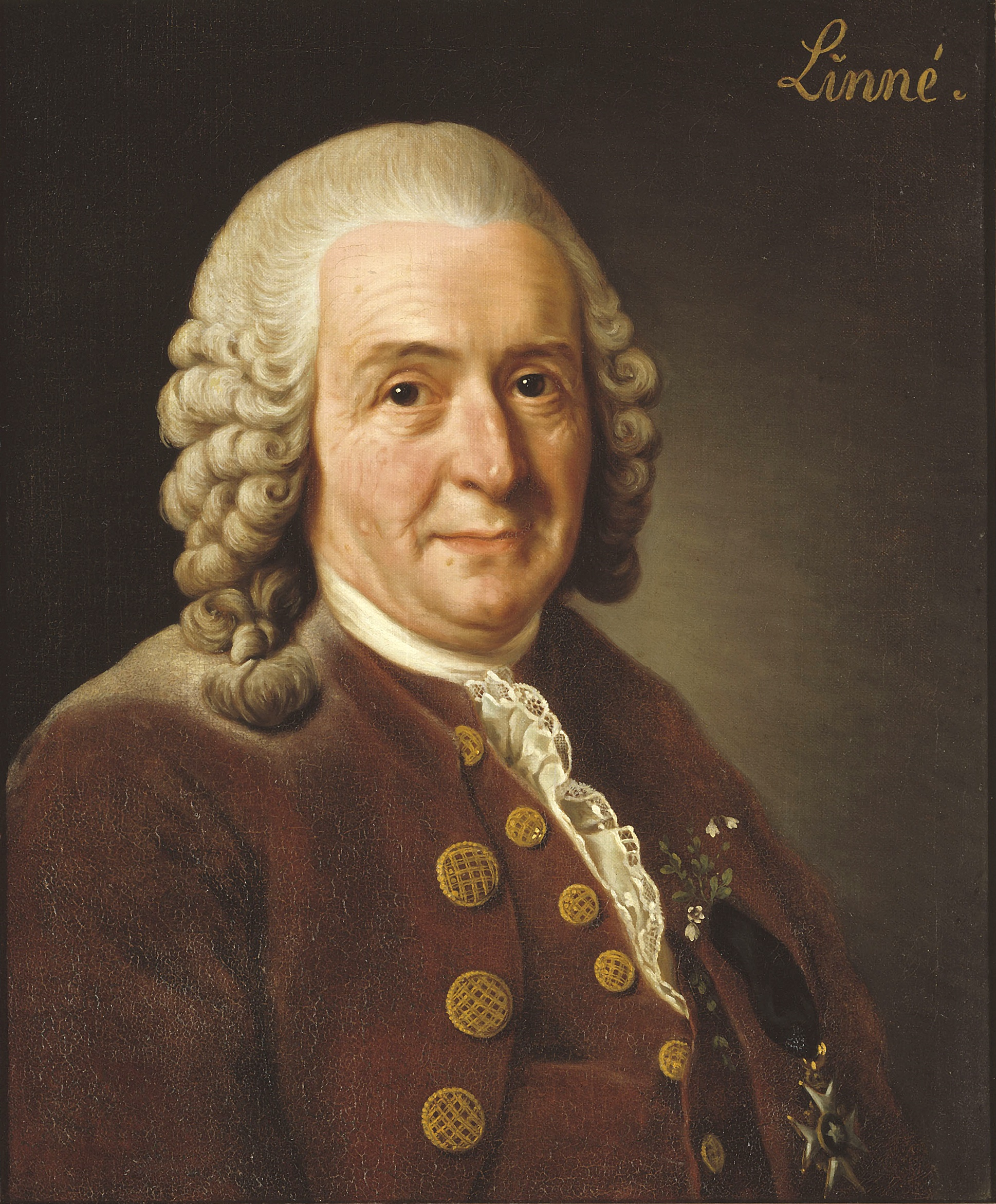
Portrait of Carl von Linné by Alexander Roslin

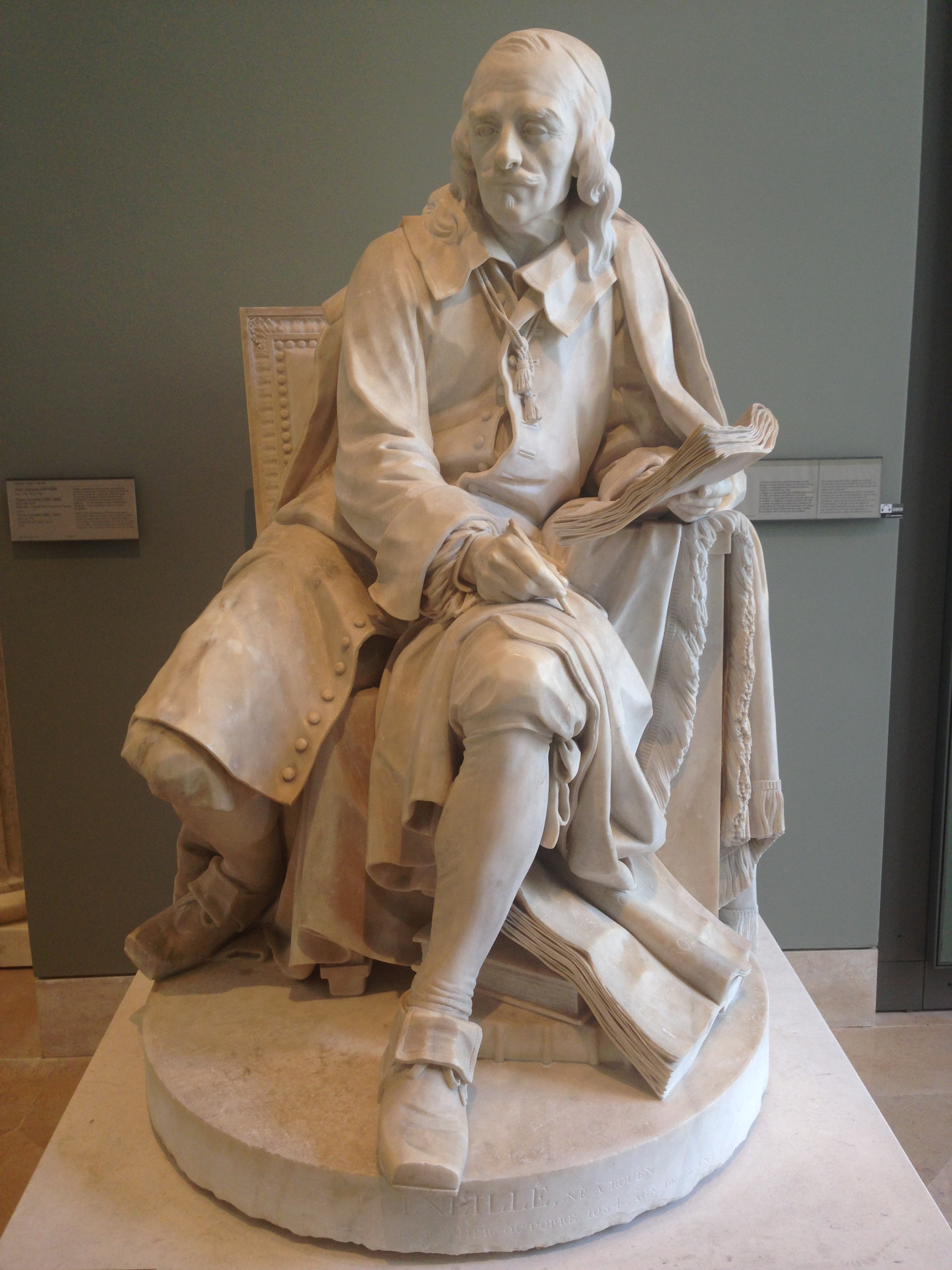
Pierre Corneille by Jean-Jacques Caffieri

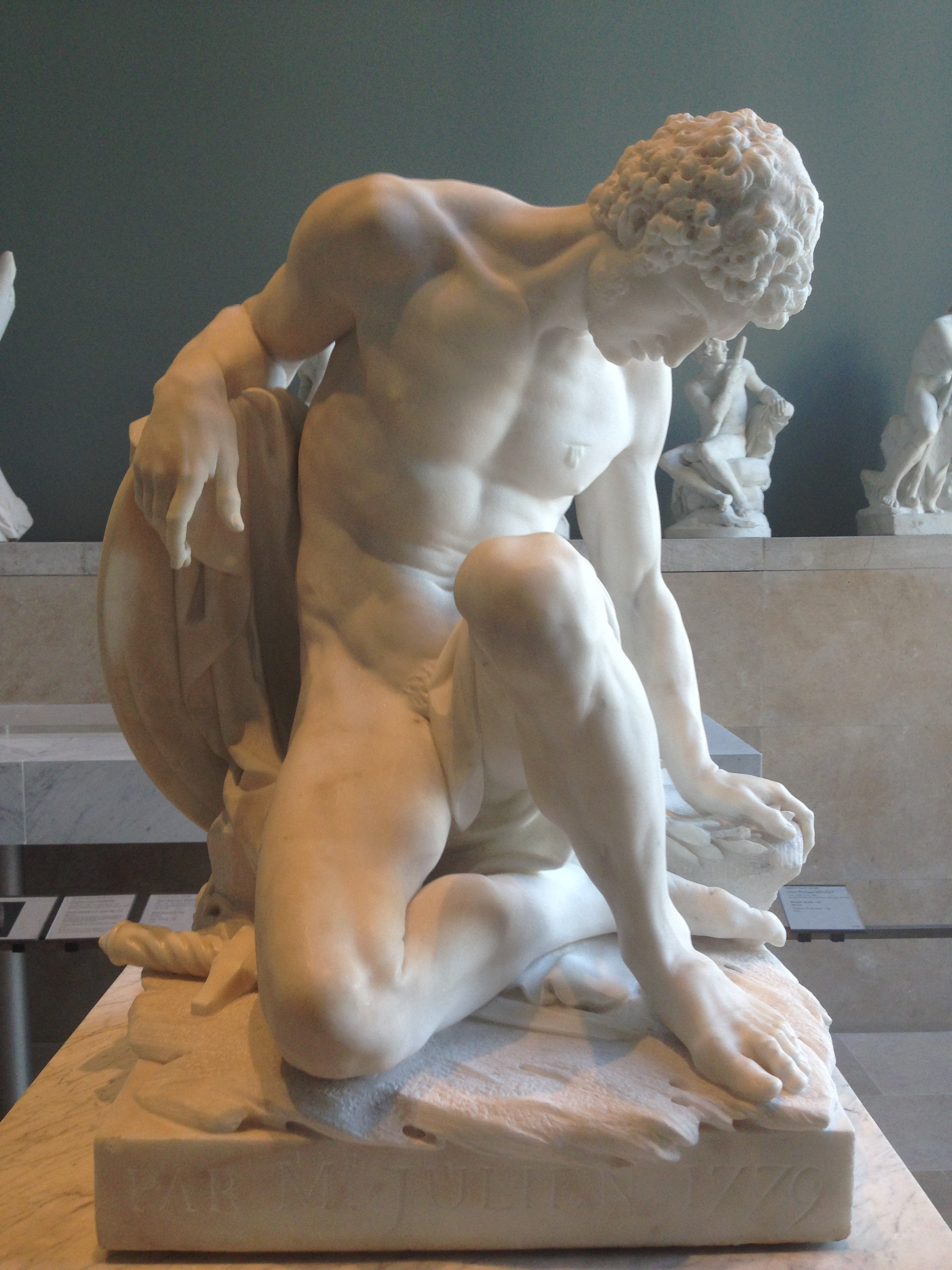
Dying Gladiator by Pierre Julien

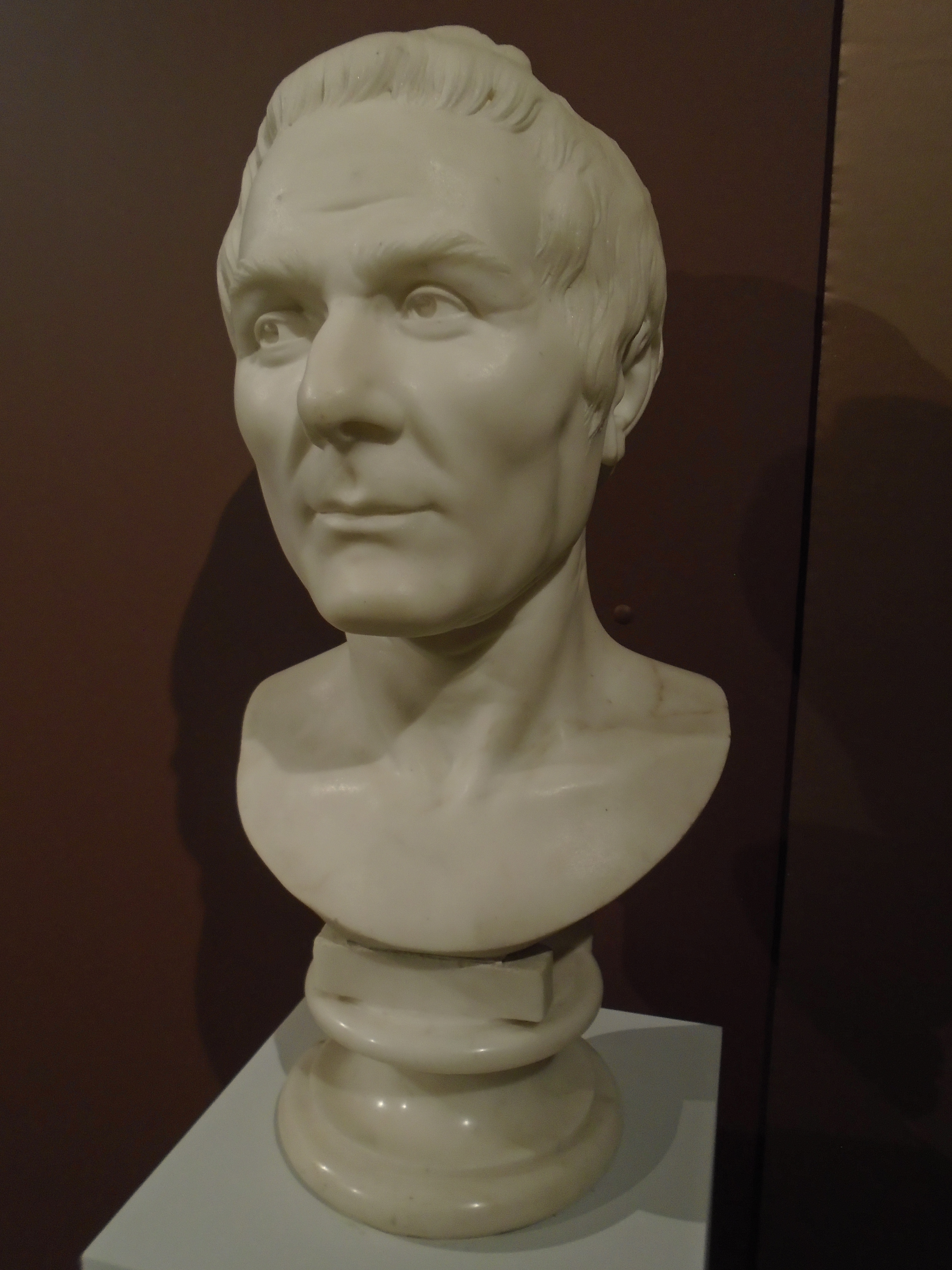
Jean-Jacques Rousseau by Jean-Antoine Houdon

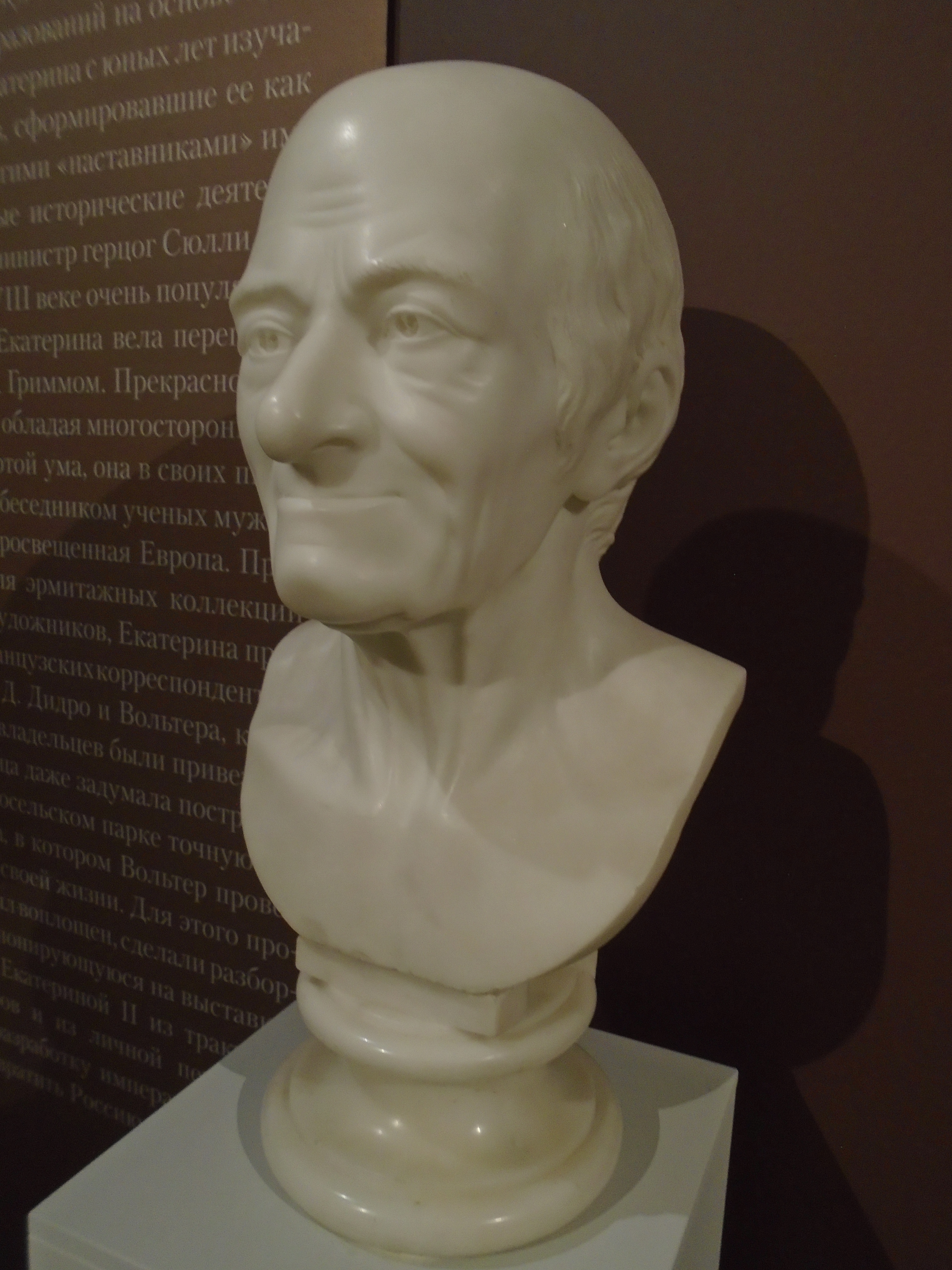
Voltaire by Jean-Antoine Houdon

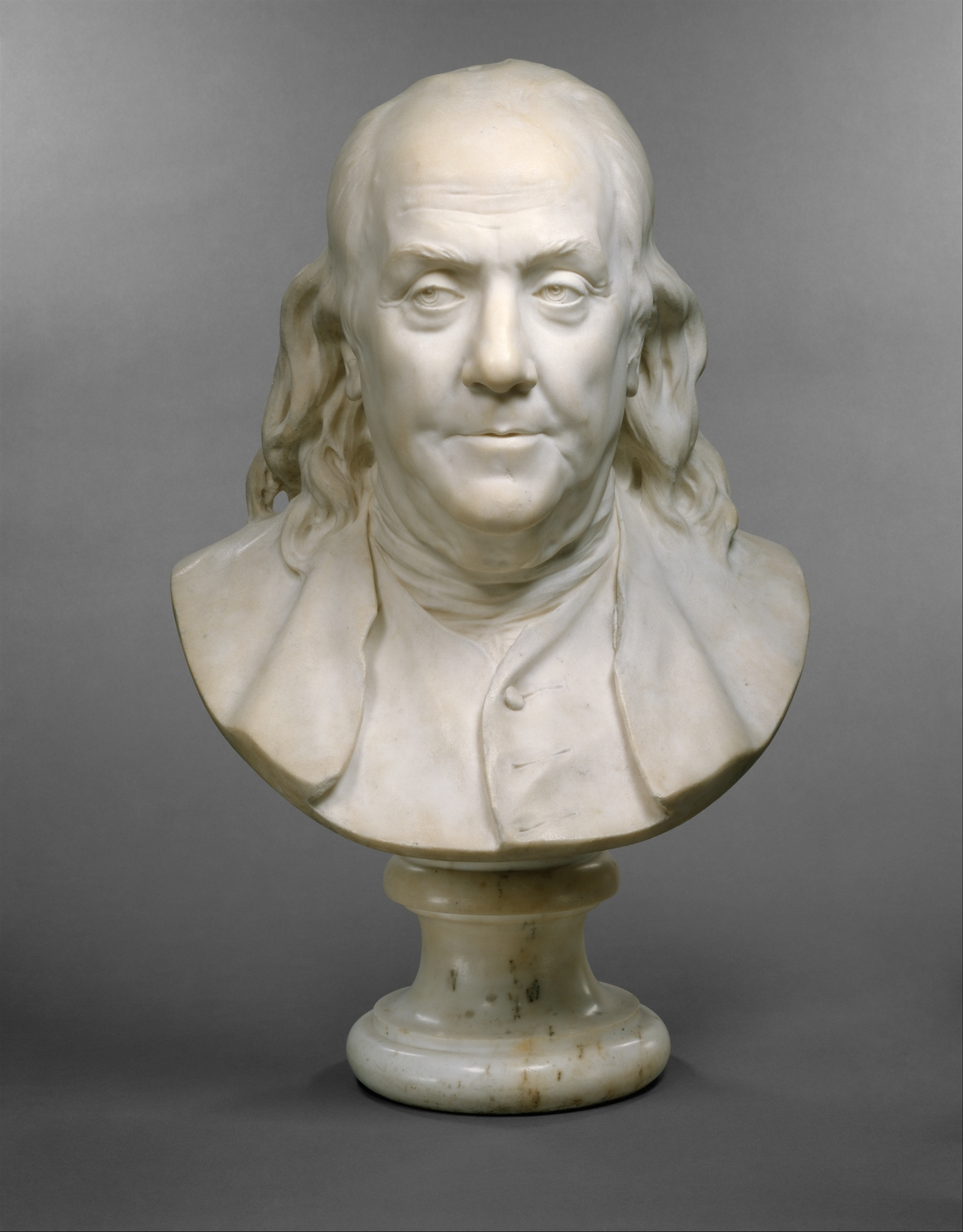
Benjamin Franklin by Jean-Antoine Houdon

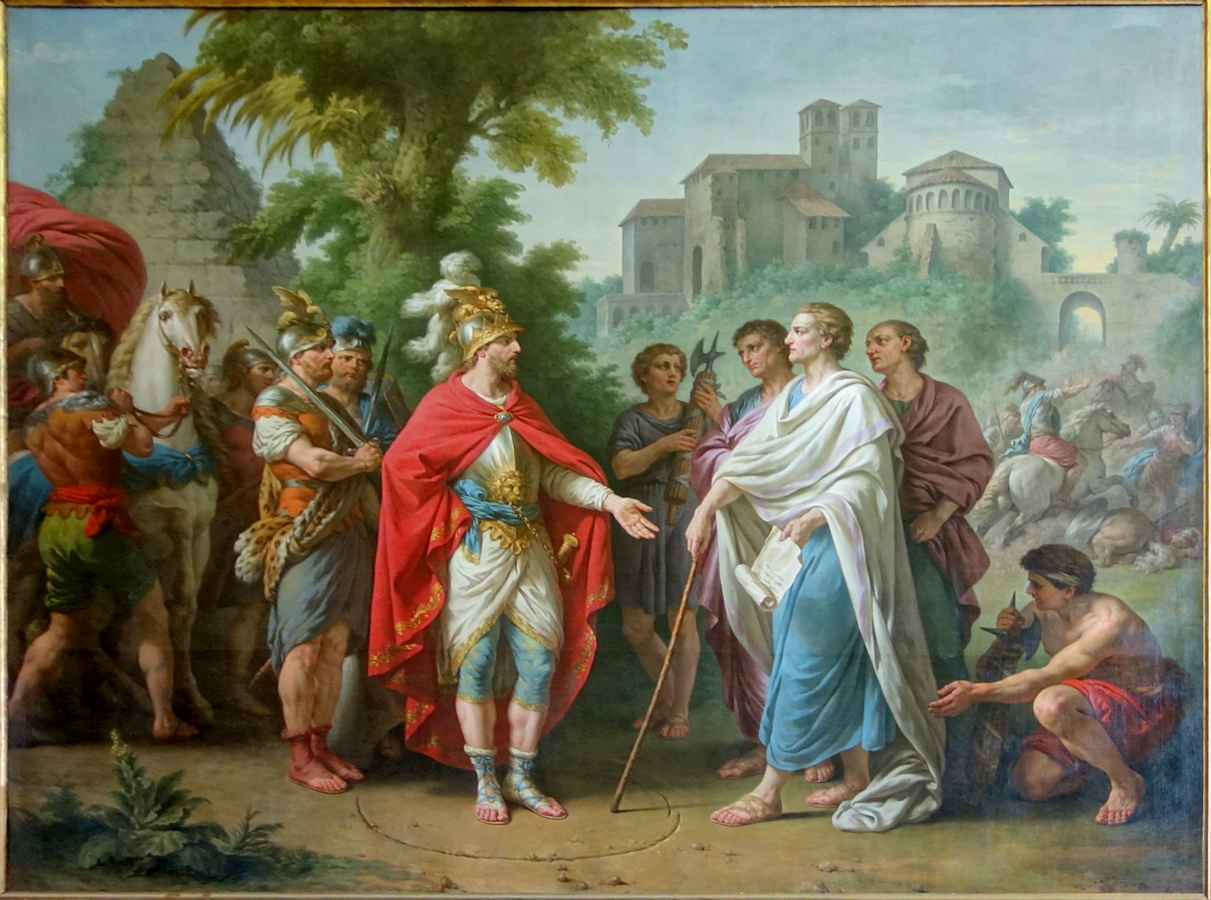
Popilius Sent as an Ambassador to Antiochus Epiphanes by Louis-Jean-François Lagrenée

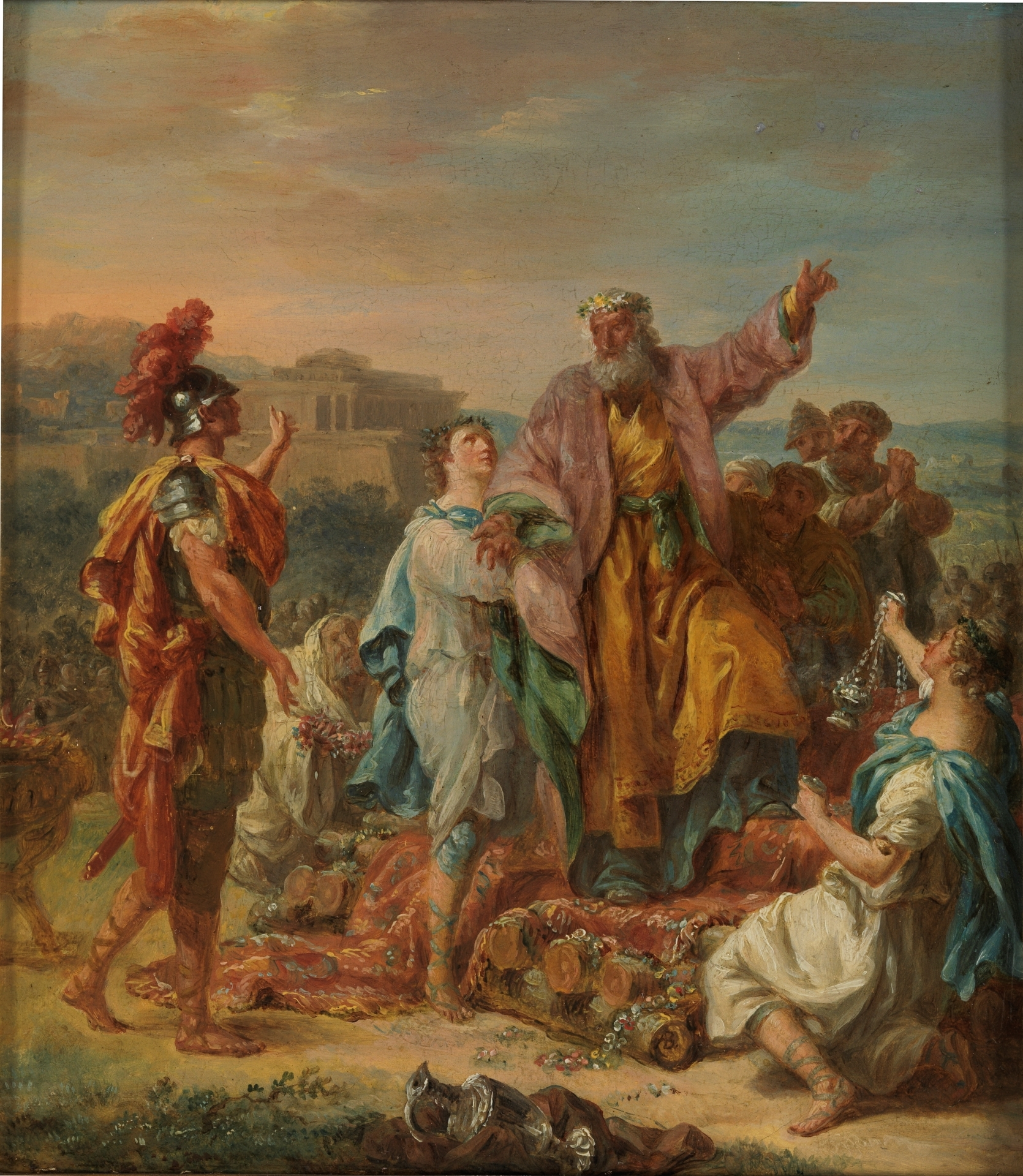
Oil sketch for The Death of Calamus by Jacques-Antoine Beaufort

== See also ==
- Salon of 1777, the previous Salon held at the Louvre
- Royal Academy Exhibition of 1779, held in London
- Category:Artworks exhibited at the Salon of 1779

== Bibliography ==
- Bailey, Colin B. The Age of Watteau, Chardin, and Fragonard: Masterpieces of French Genre Painting. Yale University Press, 2003.
- Baetjer, Katharine. French Paintings in The Metropolitan Museum of Art from the Early Eighteenth Century through the Revolution. Metropolitan Museum of Art, 2019.
- Born, Deborah Lee. The Life and Works of Hubert Robert. University of California Press, 1977.
- Levey, Michael. Painting and Sculpture in France, 1700-1789. Yale University Press, 1993.
- Poulet, Anne L. Jean-Antoine Houdon: Sculptor of the Enlightenment. University of Chicago Press, 2003.
- Rosenblum, Robert. Transformations in Late Eighteenth Century Art. Princeton University Press, 1970.
- Weststeijn, Arthur & Velema, Wyger. Ancient Models in the Early Modern Republican Imagination. Brill, 2017.
