= Joseph Duplessis =

French painter (1725–1802)

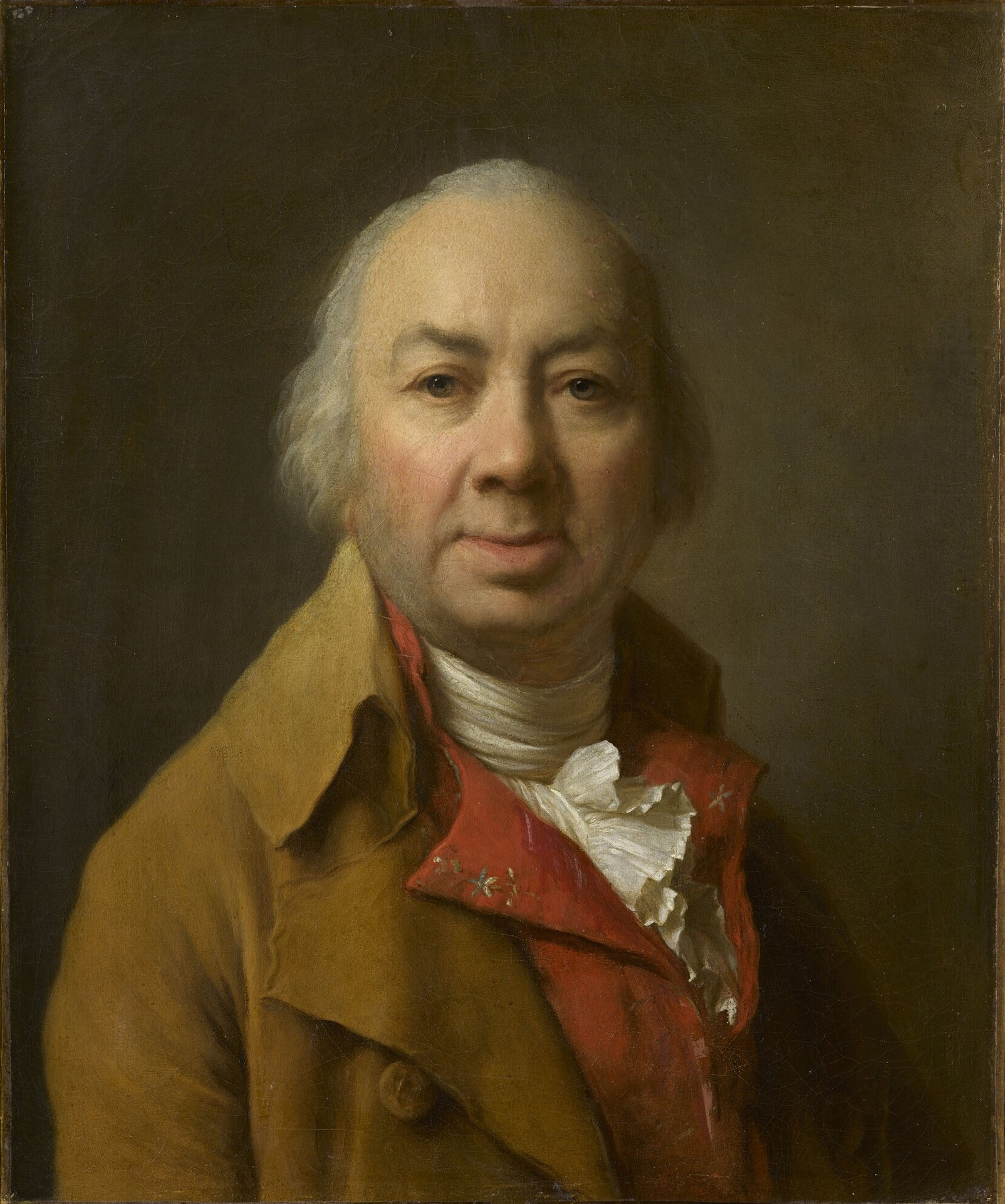
- Self-portrait, c. 1801
- Born: Joseph-Siffred Duplessis; 22 September 1725; Carpentras, Papal States
- Died: 1 April 1802 (aged 76); Versailles, France
- Known for: Painting

Joseph-Siffred Duplessis (22 September 1725 – 1 April 1802) was a French painter known for the clarity and immediacy of his portraits.

== Early life ==
He was born in Carpentras, near Avignon, into a family with an artistic bent and received his first training from his father, a surgeon and talented amateur. He subsequently studied with Joseph Gabriel Imbert (1666–1749), who had been a pupil of Charles Le Brun. From 1744 to 1747 or later he worked in Rome, in the atelier of Pierre Subleyras (1699–1749), who was also from the south of France. In Italy Duplessis became fast friends with Joseph Vernet, another Provençal speaking Occitania.

== Career ==
Duplessis returned to Carpentras, spent a brief time in Lyon then arrived about 1752 in Paris, where he was accepted into the Académie de Saint-Luc and exhibited some portraits, which were now his specialty, in 1764, but did not achieve much notice until his exhibition of ten paintings at the Paris Salon of 1769, very well received and selected for special notice by Denis Diderot; the Académie de peinture et de sculpture accepted him in the category of portraitist, considered a lesser category at the time. He continued to exhibit at the Paris salons, both finished paintings and sketches, until 1791, and once more, in 1801.

His portrait of the Dauphine in 1771 and his appointment as a peintre du Roi assured his success: most of his surviving portraits date from the 1770s and 1780s. He received privileged lodgings in the Galeries du Louvre. In the Revolution, he withdrew to safe obscurity at Carpentras during the Reign of Terror. Afterwards, from 1796, he served as curator at the newly founded museum formed at Versailles, so recently emptied of its furnishings at the Revolutionary sales. His uncompromising self-portrait at this time of his life is at Versailles, where he died. The rue Joseph Duplessis in Magnac-sur-Touvre is named after him.

== Work ==
Duplessis' Benjamin Franklin on the U.S. hundred dollar bill

Duplessis would adjust his style to the social condition of his sitter: his portrait of Charles-Claude, comte d'Angiviller, director of the Bâtiments du Roi, is as distant and conventional as his state portrait of Louis XVI in coronation robes (1776), while his realistic and intimate portrait of the opera composer Christoph Willibald Gluck (Kunsthistorisches Museum, Vienna) catches the composer at the keyboard in a moment of inspiration and his penetrating portrait of the sculptor Christophe Gabriel Allegrain (Louvre Museum, illustration) shows him having just laid down his chisel: this was the morceau de reception that gained him admittance to the Académie.

His portrait of Benjamin Franklin (circa 1785), more than any other, has fixed the image of Franklin for posterity since it is reproduced on the U.S. hundred dollar bill. His portrait of the financier Jacques Necker hung at Voltaire's Coppet Castle. Several reduced versions were made, one of which is at the Louvre. Many of his portraits received a wider circulation as engravings.

== Gallery ==
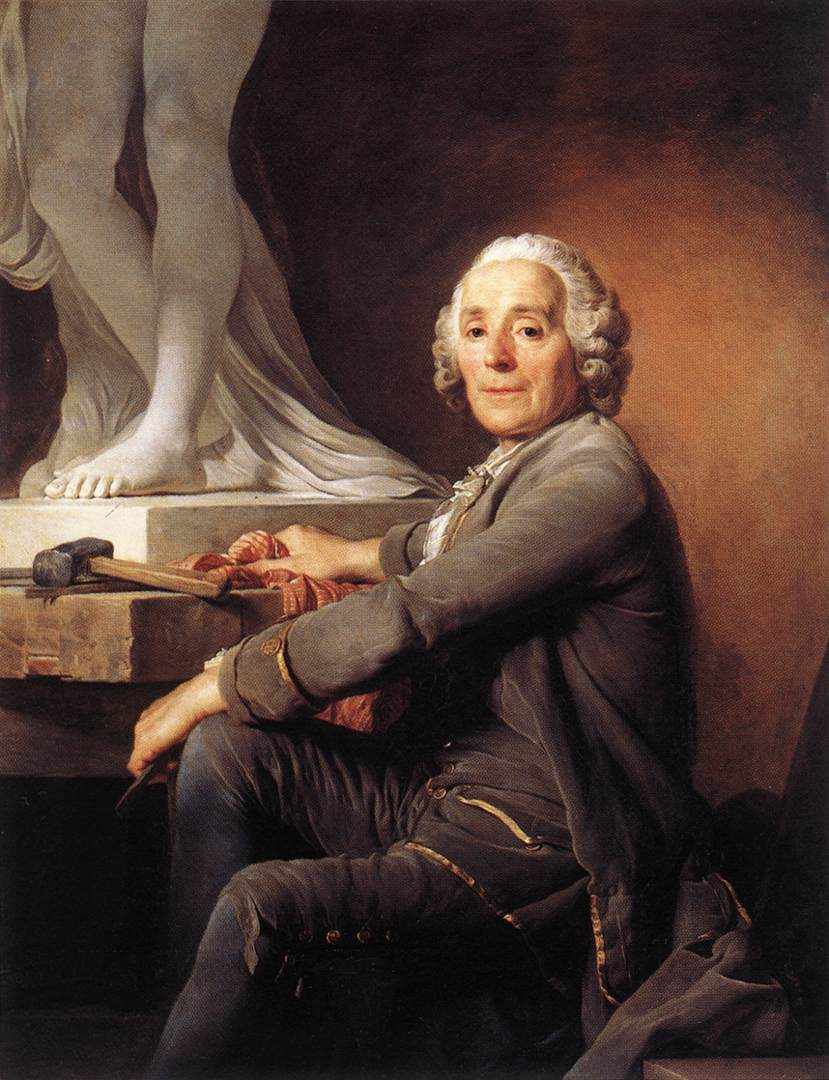
Christophe-Gabriel Allegrain, 1774

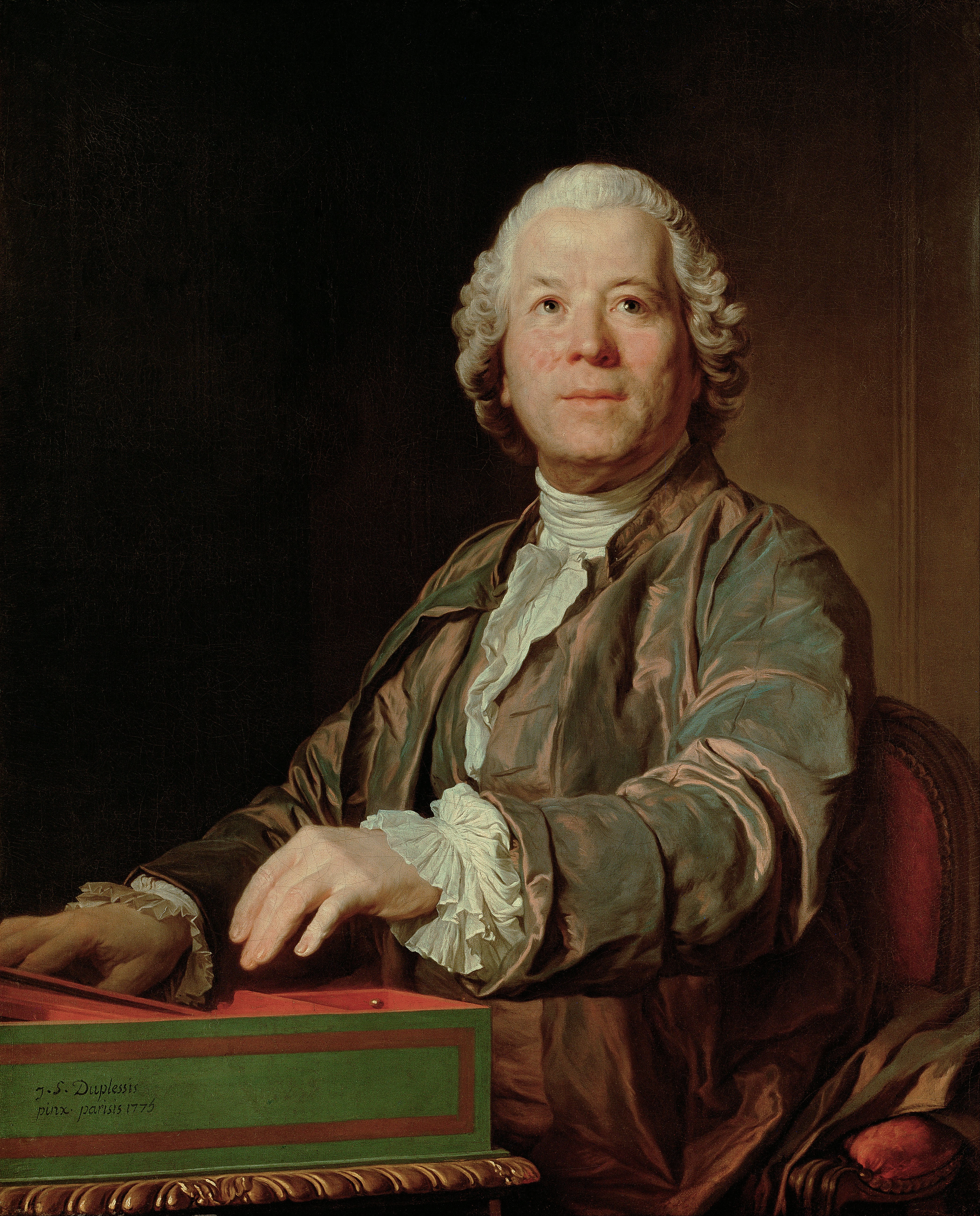
Portrait of Christoph Willibald Gluck, 1775

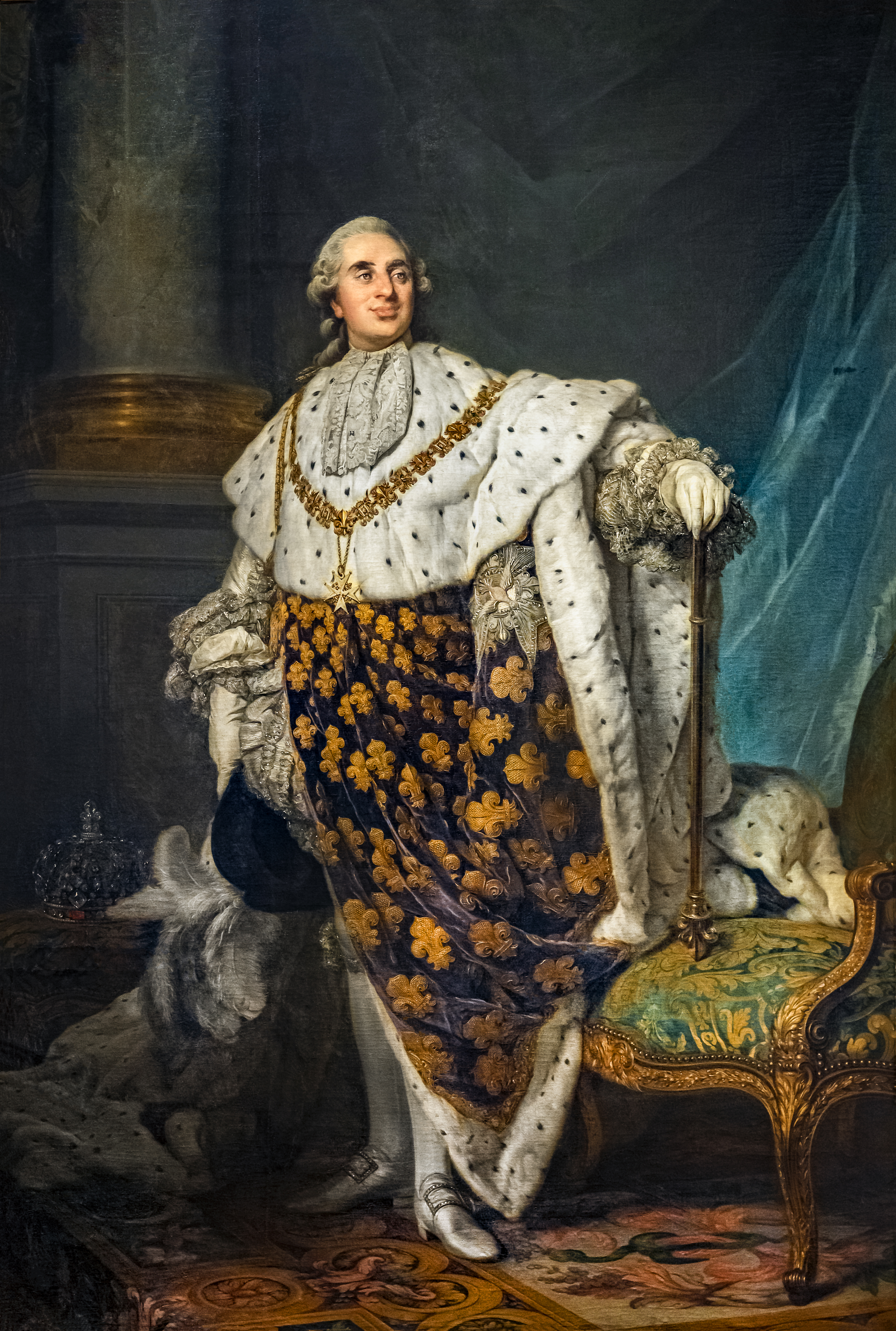
Portrait of Louis XVI, 1776

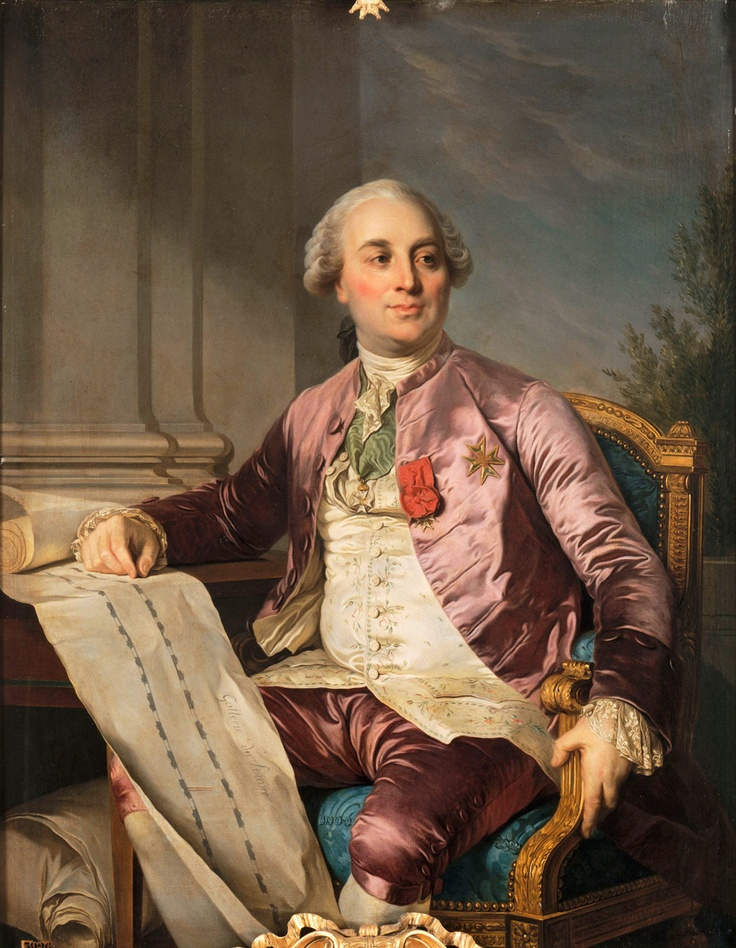
Portrait of the Comte d'Angiviller, 1779

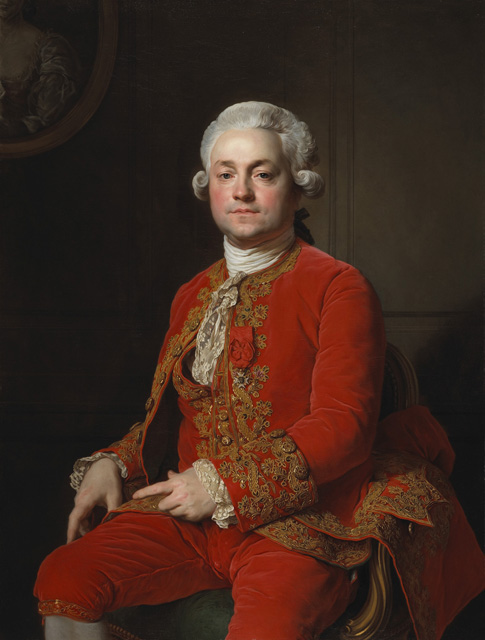
Monsieur de Buissy, 1780

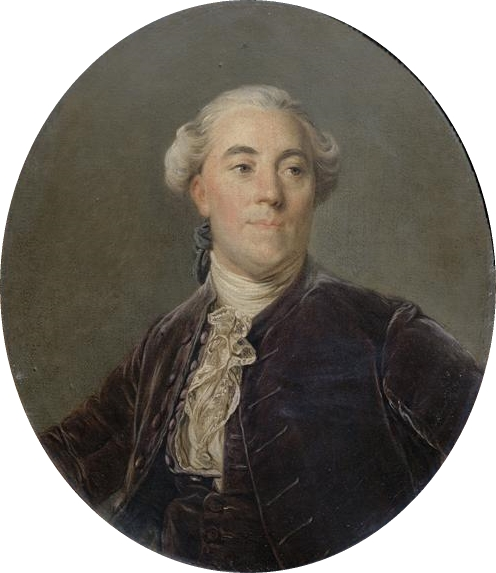
Jacques Necker, c. 1781

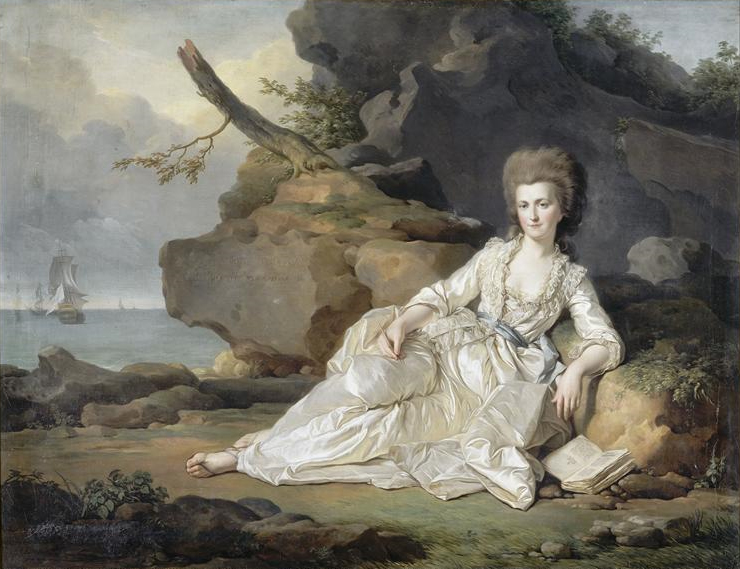
Louise Marie Adélaïde de Bourbon, 1780s

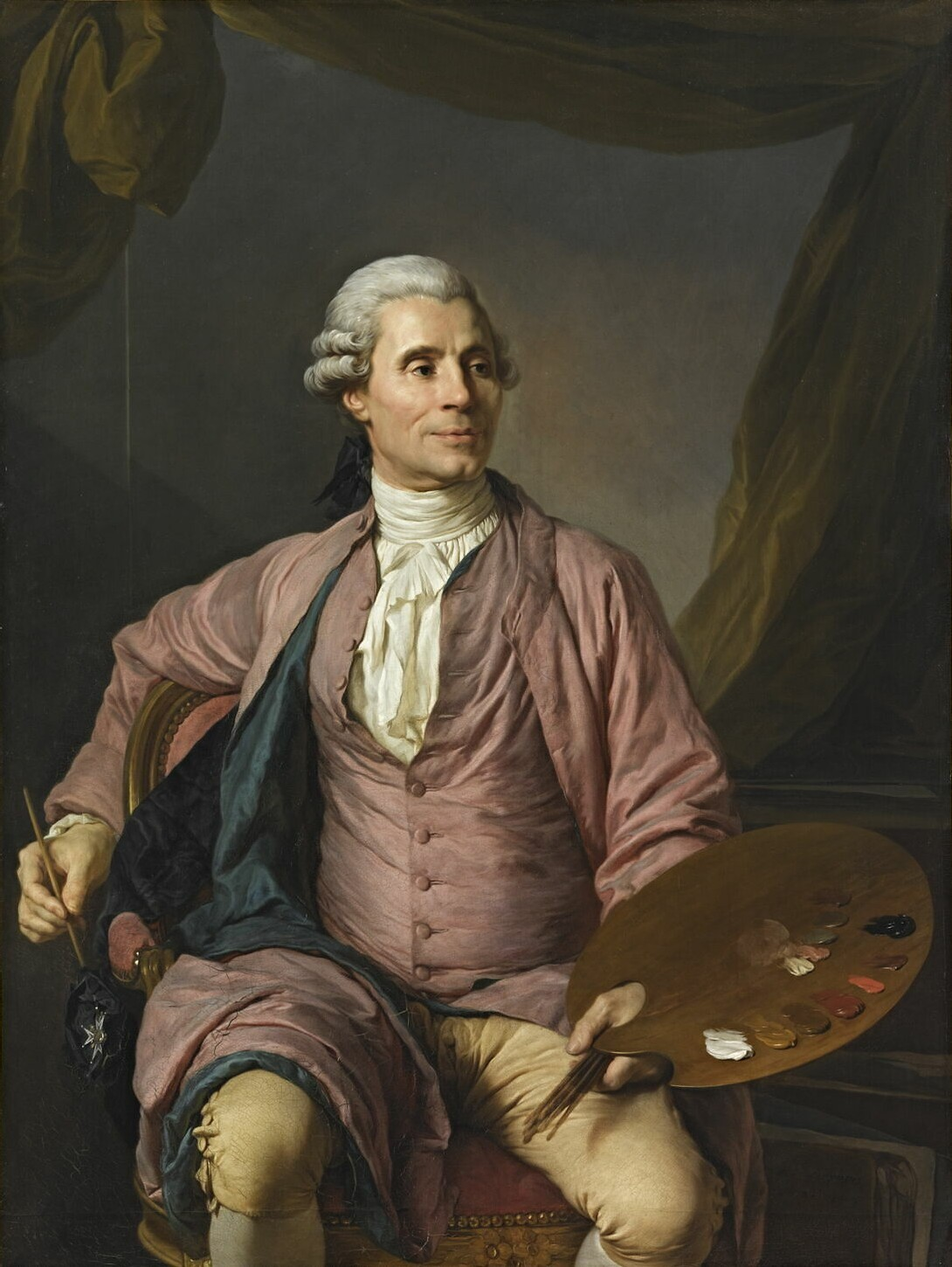
Portrait of Joseph-Marie Vien, 1784

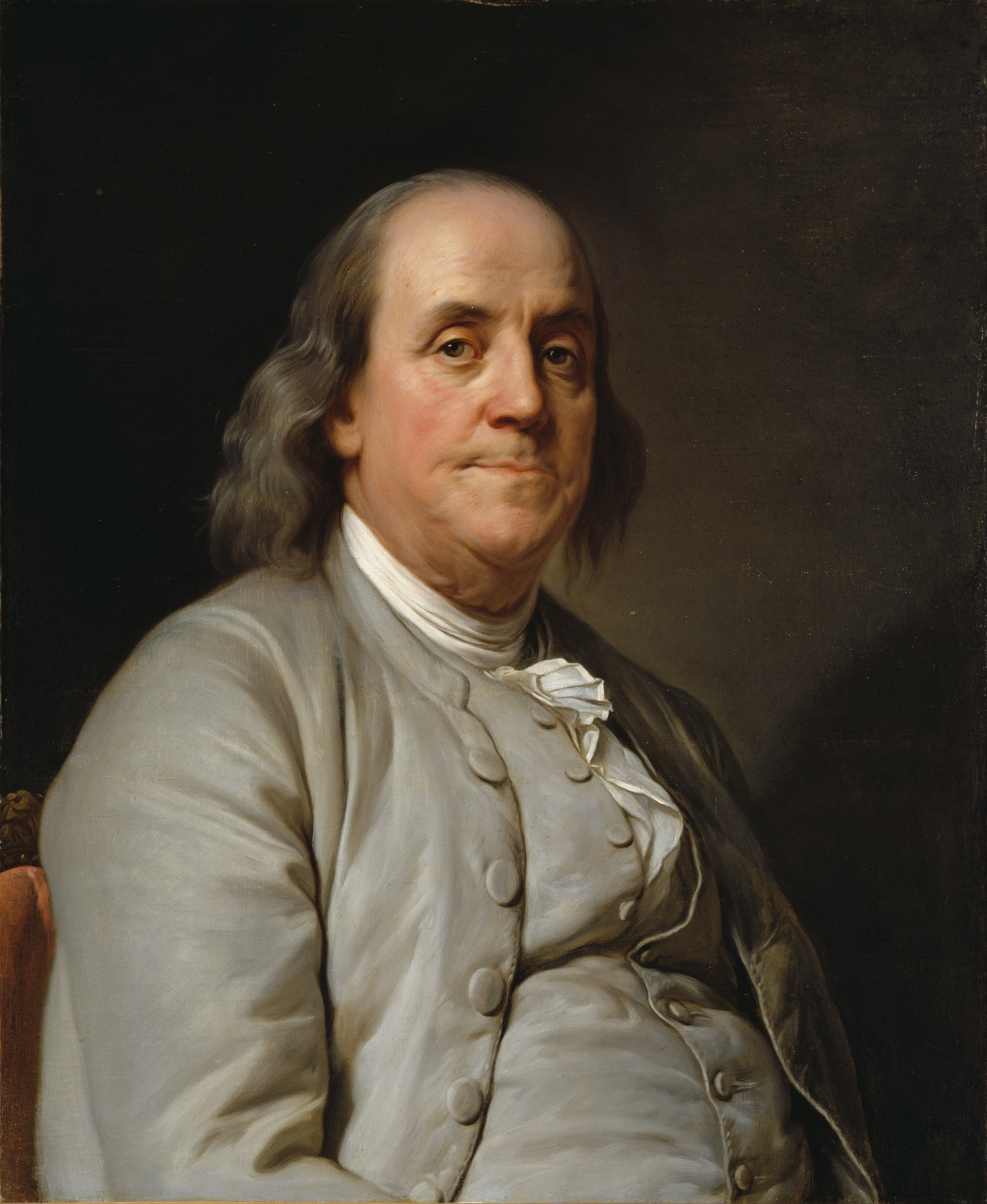
Benjamin Franklin, ca. 1785

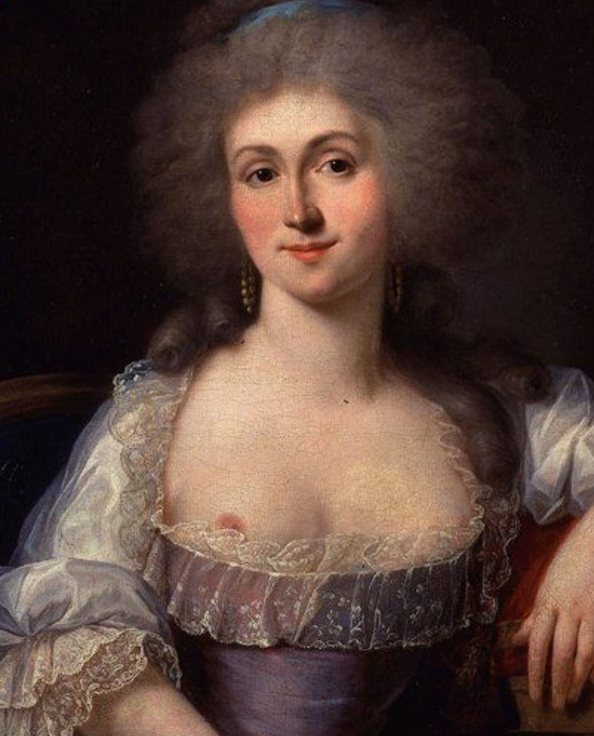
Princess of Lamballe

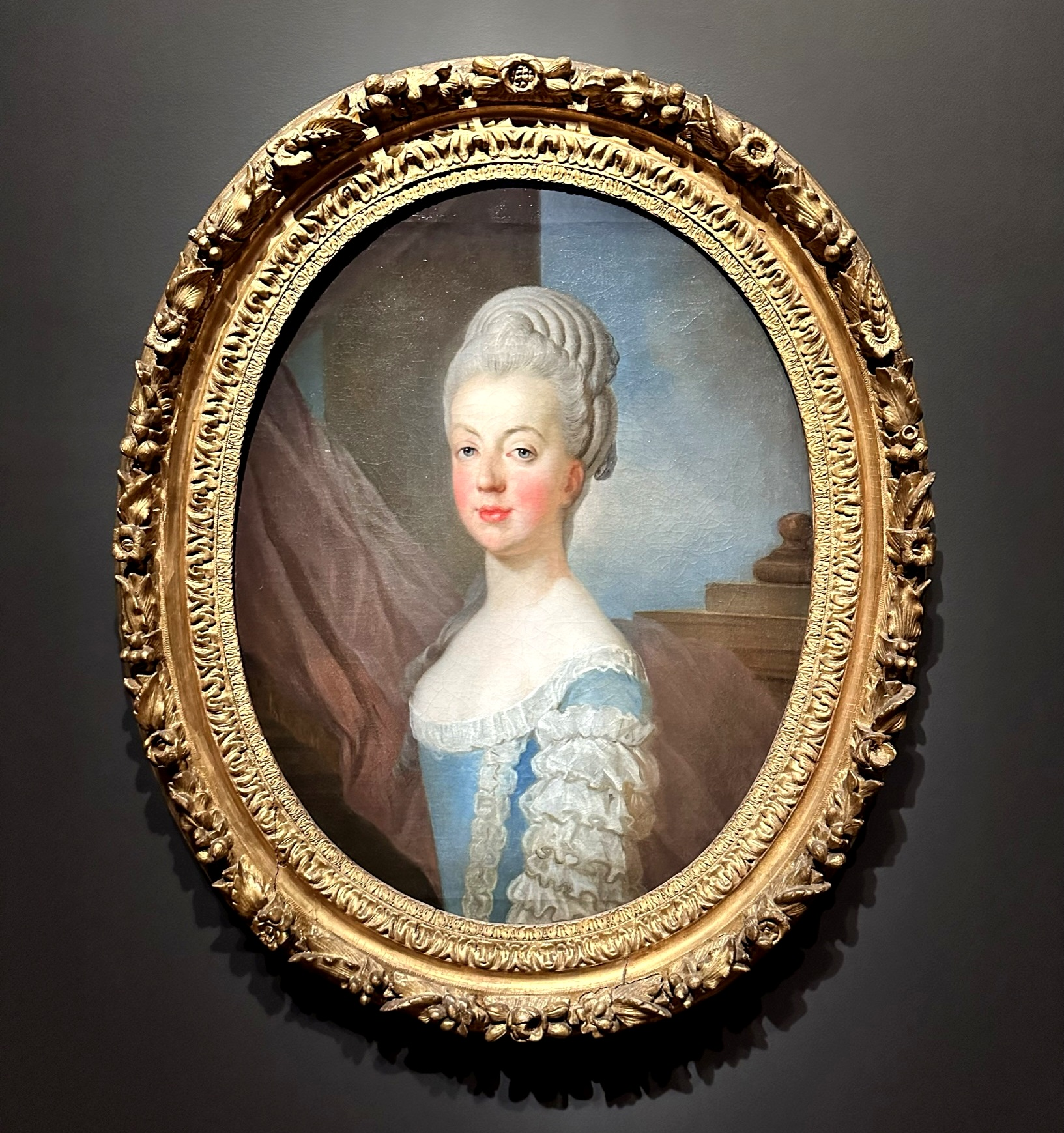
Marie-Antoinette, 1771
