= Democritus =

Greek philosopher (c. 460–c. 370 BC)

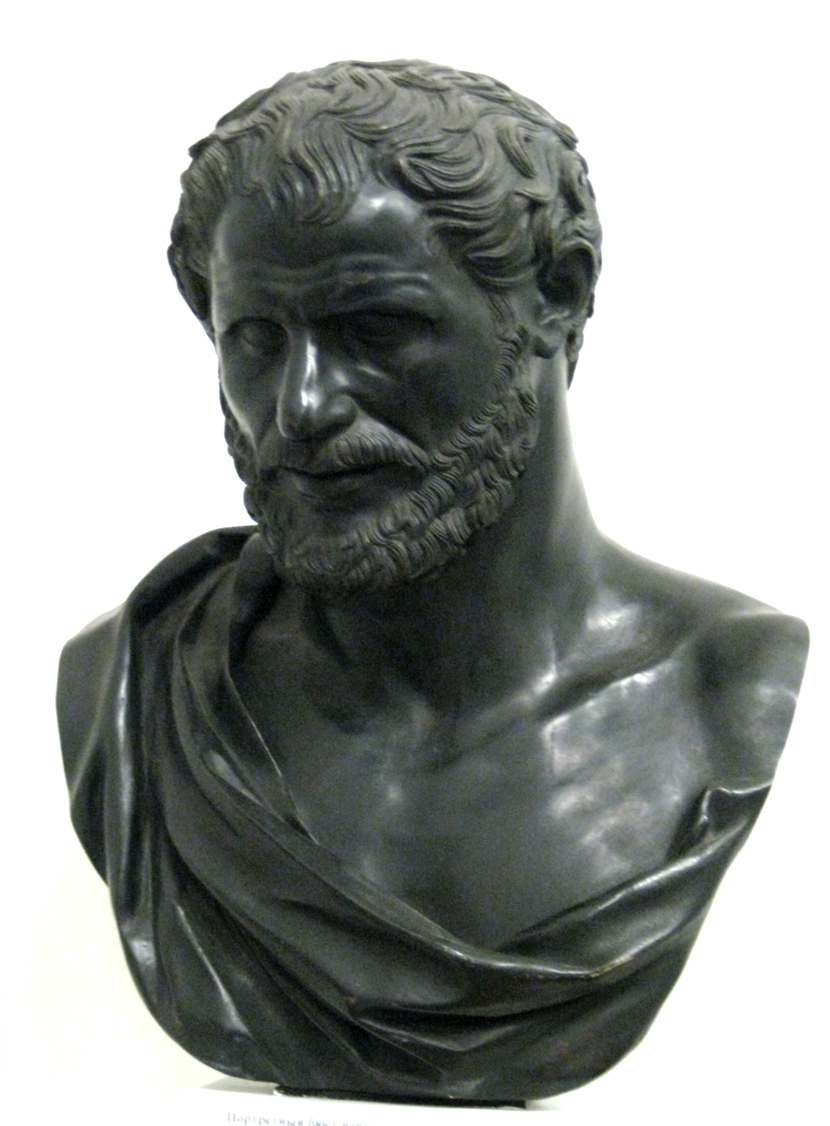
- Bust of a philosopher, possibly Democritus, from the Villa of the Papyri, Herculaneum.
- Born: c. 460 BC; Abdera, Thrace
- Died: c. 370 BC (aged approx. 90)

Education
- Academic advisor: Leucippus

Philosophical work
- Era: Pre-Socratic philosophy
- Region: Western philosophy
- School: Atomism
- Main interests: Metaphysics
- Notable ideas: Atoms and the void as the fundamental constituents of the physical world (Note: DK B125: "ἐτεῇ δὲ ἄτομα καὶ κενόν")

Democritus (/dɪˈmɒkrɪtəs/ dih-MOK-rih-təs; Greek: Δημόκριτος, Dēmókritos; c. 460 – c. 370 BC) was a pre-Socratic Greek philosopher from Abdera, primarily remembered today for his formulation of an atomic theory of the universe. Democritus wrote extensively on a wide variety of topics.

None of Democritus' original work has survived, except through second-hand references. Many of these references come from Aristotle, who viewed him as an important rival in the field of natural philosophy. He was known in antiquity as the 'laughing philosopher' because of his emphasis on the value of cheerfulness.

== Life ==
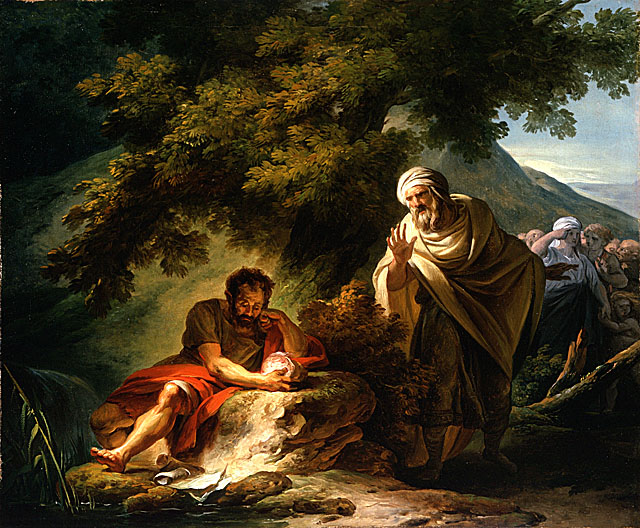
Democritus Among the Abderites by François-André Vincent, 1791

Although many anecdotes about Democritus' life survive, their authenticity cannot be verified and modern scholars doubt their accuracy.

According to Aristotle, Democritus was born in Abdera, on the coast of Thrace. He was a polymath and prolific writer, producing nearly eighty treatises on subjects such as poetry, harmony, military tactics, and Babylonian theology. Some called him a Milesian, and the name of his father too is stated differently. His birth year was fixed by Apollodorus in the first year of the 80th Olympiad, or 460 BC, while Thrasyllus had referred it to as the 3rd year of the 77th Olympiad. Democritus had called himself forty years younger than Anaxagoras. His father, Hegesistratus—or as others called him Damasippus or Athenocritus—was possessed of so large a property, that he was able to receive and treat Xerxes on his march through Abdera.

Democritus spent the inheritance left to him by his father on travels to distant countries, which he undertook to satisfy his extraordinary thirst for knowledge. He traveled over a great part of Asia, and, as some state, he even reached India and Aethiopia. We know that he wrote on Babylon and Meroe; he must also have visited Egypt, and Diodorus Siculus even states, that he lived there for a period of five years. He himself declared, that among his contemporaries none had made greater journeys, seen more countries, and made the acquaintance of more men distinguished in every kind of science than himself. Among the last he mentions in particular the Egyptian mathematicians (ἀρπεδονάπται; comp. Sturz, de Dialect. Maced. p. 98), whose knowledge he praises, without, however, regarding himself inferior to them. Theophrastus, too, spoke of him as a man who had seen many countries. It was his desire to acquire an extensive knowledge of nature that led him into distant countries at a time when travelling was the principal means of acquiring an intellectual and scientific culture; and after returning to his native land he occupied himself only with philosophical investigations, especially such as related to natural history.

In Greece itself, too, he endeavored by means of traveling and residing in the principal cities to acquire a knowledge of Hellenic culture and civilization. He mentioned many Greek philosophers in his writings, and his wealth enabled him to purchase the works they had written. He thus succeeded in excelling, in the extent of his knowledge, all the earlier Greek philosophers, among whom Leucippus, the founder of the atomistic theory, is said to have exercised the greatest influence upon his philosophical studies. The opinion that he was a disciple of Anaxagoras or of the Pythagoreans, perhaps arose merely from the fact, that he mentioned them in his writings. The account of his hostility towards Anaxagoras, is contradicted by several passages in which he speaks of him in terms of high praise. It is further said, that he was on terms of friendship with Hippocrates, and some writers even speak of a correspondence between Democritus and Hippocrates; but this statement does not seem to be deserving of credit. As he was a contemporary of Plato, it may be that he was acquainted with Socrates, perhaps even with Plato, who, however, does not mention Democritus anywhere. Aristotle describes him and his views as belonging to the pre-Socratic period; but some scholars, such as Groen van Prinsterer, assert that there are symptoms in Plato which show a connection with Democritus, in Plato's language and style an imitation of Democritus.

The many anecdotes about Democritus which are preserved, especially in Diogenes Laertius, show that he was a man of a most sterling and honourable character. His diligence was incredible: he lived exclusively for his studies, and his disinterestedness, modesty, and simplicity are attested by many features which are related of him. Notwithstanding his great property, he seems to have died in poverty, though highly esteemed by his fellow-citizens, not so much on account of his philosophy, as "because," as Diogenes says, " he had foretold them some things which the event proved to be true." This had probably reference to his knowledge of natural phaenomena. His fellow-citizens honoured him with presents in money and bronze statues. Even the scoffer Timon, who in his Silloi spared no one, speaks of Democritus only in terms of praise. We cannot leave unnoticed the tradition that Democritus deprived himself of his sight, in order to be less disturbed in his pursuits. But this tradition is one of the inventions of a later age, which was fond of piquant anecdotes. It is more probable that he may have lost his sight by too severe application to study. This loss, however, did not disturb the cheerful disposition of his mind and his views of human life, which prompted him everywhere to look at the cheerful and comical side of things, which later writers took to mean, that he always laughed at the follies of men.

Ancient accounts of his life have claimed that he lived to a very old age, with some writers claiming that he was over a hundred years old at the time of his death, (some say that he was 109 years old), and even the manner in which he died is characteristic of his medical knowledge, which, combined as it was with his knowledge of nature, caused a report, which was believed by some persons, that he was a sorcerer and a magician. His death is placed in the 4th year of the 105th Olympiad, or 357 BC, in which year Hippocrates also is said to have died.

== Philosophy ==
Democritus wrote on ethics as well as physics. Democritus was a student of Leucippus. Early sources such as Aristotle and Theophrastus credit Leucippus with creating atomism and sharing its ideas with Democritus, but later sources credit only Democritus, making it hard to distinguish their individual contributions.

=== Atomism ===
It was Democritus who, in his numerous writings, carried out Leucippus's theory of atoms, and especially in his observations on nature. These atomists undertook the task of proving that the quantitative relations of matter were its original characteristics, and that its qualitative relations were something secondary and derivative, and of thus doing away with the distinction between matter and mind or power. In order to avoid the difficulties connected with the supposition of primitive matter with definite qualities, without admitting the coming into existence and annihilation as realities, and without giving up, as the Eleatic philosophers did, the reality of variety and its changes, the atomists derived all definiteness of phaenomena, both physical and mental, from elementary particles, the infinite number of which were homogeneous in quality, but heterogeneous in form. This made it necessary for them to establish the reality of a vacuum or space, and of motion. Motion, they said, is the eternal and necessary consequence of the original variety of atoms in the vacuum or space. All phaenomena arise from the infinite variety of the form, order, and position of the atoms in forming combinations. It is impossible, they add, to derive this supposition from any higher principle, for a beginning of the infinite is inconceivable. The atoms are impenetrable, and therefore offer resistance to one another. This creates a swinging, world-producing, and whirling motion. (This reminds us of the joke in the Clouds of Aristophanes about the god Δῖνος !) Now as similars attract one another, there arise in that motion real things and beings, that is, combinations of distinct atoms, which still continue to be separated from one another by the vacuum. The first cause of all existence is necessity, that is, the necessary predestination and necessary succession of cause and effect. This they called chance, in opposition to the νοῦς of Anaxagoras. But it does the highest honour to the mind of Democritus, that he made the discovery of causes the highest object of scientific investigations. He once said, that he preferred the discovery of a true cause to the possession of the kingdom of Persia. We must not, therefore, take the word chance (τυχή) in its vulgar acceptation. Aristotle understood Democritus rightly in this respect, as he generally valued him highly, and often says of him, that he had thought on all subjects, searched after the first causes of phenomena, and endeavored to find definitions. The only thing for which he censures him, is a disregard for teleological relations, and the want of a comprehensive system of induction. Democritus himself called the common notion of chance a cover of human ignorance (πρόφα-σιν ἰδίης ἀνοίης), and an invention of those who were too idle to think.

Democritus held that originally the universe was composed of nothing but tiny atoms churning in chaos, until they collided together to form larger units—including the earth and everything on it. He surmised that there are many worlds, some growing, some decaying; some with no sun or moon, some with several. He held that every world has a beginning and an end and that a world could be destroyed by collision with another world. (Note: To epitomize Democritus's cosmology, Russell calls on Shelley: "Worlds on worlds are rolling ever / From creation to decay, / Like the bubbles on a river / Sparkling, bursting, borne away".)He concluded that divisibility of matter comes to an end, and the smallest possible fragments must be bodies with sizes and shapes, although the exact argument for this conclusion of his is not known. The smallest and indivisible bodies he called "atoms".

Atoms, Democritus believed, are too small to be detected by the senses; they are infinite in numbers and come in infinitely many varieties, and they have existed forever and that these atoms are in constant motion in the void or vacuum. The middle-sized objects of everyday life are complexes of atoms that are brought together by random collisions, differing in kind based on the variations among their constituent atoms. For Democritus, the only true realities are atoms and the void. What we perceive as water, fire, plants, or humans are merely combinations of atoms in the void. The sensory qualities we experience are not real; they exist only by convention. Of the mass of atoms, Democritus said, "The more any indivisible exceeds, the heavier it is." However, his exact position on atomic weight is disputed.

The atomistic void hypothesis was a response to the paradoxes of Parmenides and Zeno, the founders of metaphysical logic, who put forth difficult-to-answer arguments in favor of the idea that there can be no movement. They held that any movement would require a void—which is nothing—but a nothing cannot exist. The Parmenidean position was "You say there is a void; therefore the void is not nothing; therefore there is not the void." The position of Parmenides appeared validated by the observation that where there seems to be nothing there is air, and indeed even where there is not matter there is something, for instance light waves. The atomists agreed that motion required a void, but simply rejected the argument of Parmenides on the grounds that motion was an observable fact. Therefore, they asserted, there must be a void.

His exact contributions are difficult to disentangle from those of his mentor Leucippus, as they are often mentioned together in texts. Their speculation on atoms, taken from Leucippus, bears a passing and partial resemblance to the 19th-century understanding of atomic structure that has led some to regard Democritus as more of a scientist than other Greek philosophers; however, their ideas rested on very different bases. Democritus, along with Leucippus and Epicurus, proposed the earliest views on the shapes and connectivity of atoms. They reasoned that the solidness of the material corresponded to the shape of the atoms involved. Using analogies from humans' sense experiences, he gave a picture or an image of an atom that distinguished them from each other by their shape, their size, and the arrangement of their parts. Moreover, connections were explained by material links in which single atoms were supplied with attachments: some with hooks and eyes, others with balls and sockets.

Besides the infinite number of atoms existing in infinite space, Democritus also supposed the existence of an infinite number of worlds, some of which resembled one another, while others differed from one another, and each of these worlds was kept together as one thing by a sort of shell or skin. He derived the four elements from the form of the atoms predominating in each, from their quality, and their relations of magnitude. In deriving individual things from atoms, he mainly considered the qualities of warm and cold. The warm or firelike he took to be a combination of fine, spheric, and very movable atoms, as opposed to the cold and moist. His mode of proceeding, however, was, first carefully to observe and describe the phaenomena themselves, and then to attempt his atomistic explanation, whereby he essentially advanced the knowledge of nature. He derived the soul, the origin of life, consciousness, and thought from the finest fire-atoms; and in connection with this theory he made very profound physiological investigations. It was for this reason that, according to him, the soul while in the body acquires perceptions and knowledge by corporeal contact, and that it is affected by heat and cold. The sensuous perceptions themselves were to him affections of the organ or of the subject perceiving, dependent on the changes of bodily condition, on the difference of the organs and their quality, on air and light. Hence the differences, e. g., of taste, color, and temperature, are only conventional, the real cause of those differences being in the atoms.

=== Epistemology ===
It was very natural, given his theory or perception, that Democritus described even the knowledge obtained by sensuous perception as obscure (σκοτίην κρίσιν). A clear and pure knowledge is only that which has reference to the true principles or the true nature of things, that is, to the atoms and space. But knowledge derived from reason was, in his opinion, not specifically different from that acquired through the senses; for conception and reflection were to him only effects of impressions made upon the senses; and Aristotle, therefore, expressly states, that Democritus did not consider mind as something peculiar, or as a power distinct from the soul or sensuous perception, but that he considered knowledge derived from reason to be sensuous perceptions. A purer and higher knowledge which he opposed to the obscure knowledge obtained through the medium of the senses, must therefore have been to him a kind of sensation, that is, a direct perception of the atoms and of space. For this reason he assumed the three criteria (κριτήρια): a. Phaenomena as criteria for discovering that which is hidden : b. Thought as a criterion of investigation : and c. Assertions as criteria of desires. Now as Democritus acknowledged the uncertainty of perceptions, and as he was unable to establish a higher and purely spiritual source of knowledge as distinct from perceptions, we often find him complaining that all human knowledge is uncertain, that in general either nothing is absolutely true, or at least not clear to us, that our senses grope about in the dark, and that all our views and opinions are subjective, and come to us only like something epidemic, as it were, with the air which we breathe.

=== Mathematics ===
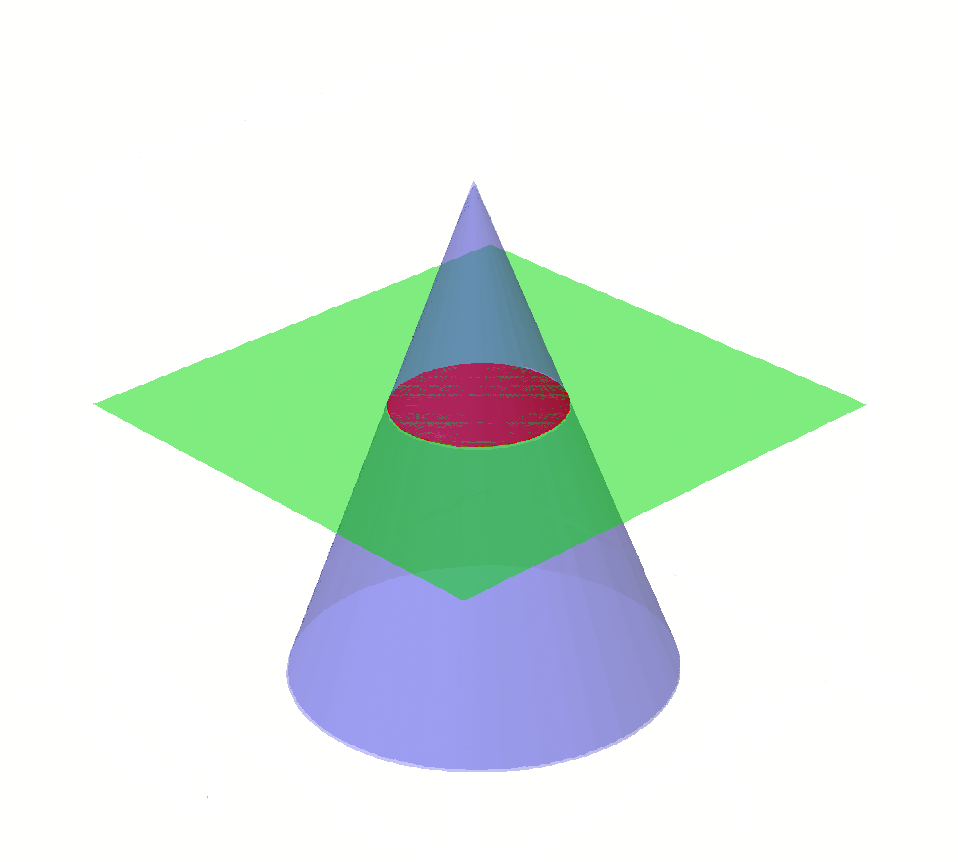
Democritus argued that the circular cross-section of a cone would need step-like sides, rather than being shaped like a cylinder.

Democritus was also a pioneer of mathematics and geometry in particular. In The Method of Mechanical Theorems, Archimedes states that Eudoxus of Cnidus, whose rigorous proof using the method of exhaustion that the volume of a cone is one-third the volume of cylinder is preserved in Euclid's Elements, was aided by the fact that Democritus had already asserted it to be true on the argument that this is true for the same reason that the pyramid has one-third the rectangular prism of the same base. Plutarch also reports that Democritus argued that the circular cross-section of a cone would need step-like sides, rather than being shaped like a cylinder, which Thomas Heath suggests may be an early version of infinitesimal calculus.

=== Anthropology ===
Democritus thought that the first humans lived an anarchic and animal sort of life, foraging individually and living off the most palatable herbs and the fruit which grew wild on the trees, until fear of wild animals drove them together into societies. He believed that these early people had no language, but that they gradually began to articulate their expressions, establishing symbols for every sort of object, and in this manner came to understand each other. He says that the earliest men lived laboriously, having none of the utilities of life; clothing, houses, fire, domestication, and farming were unknown to them. Democritus presents the early period of mankind as one of learning by trial and error, and says that each step slowly led to more discoveries; they took refuge in the caves in winter, stored fruits that could be preserved, and through reason and keenness of mind came to build upon each new idea. (Note: Diodorus I.viii.1–7.)

=== Ethics ===
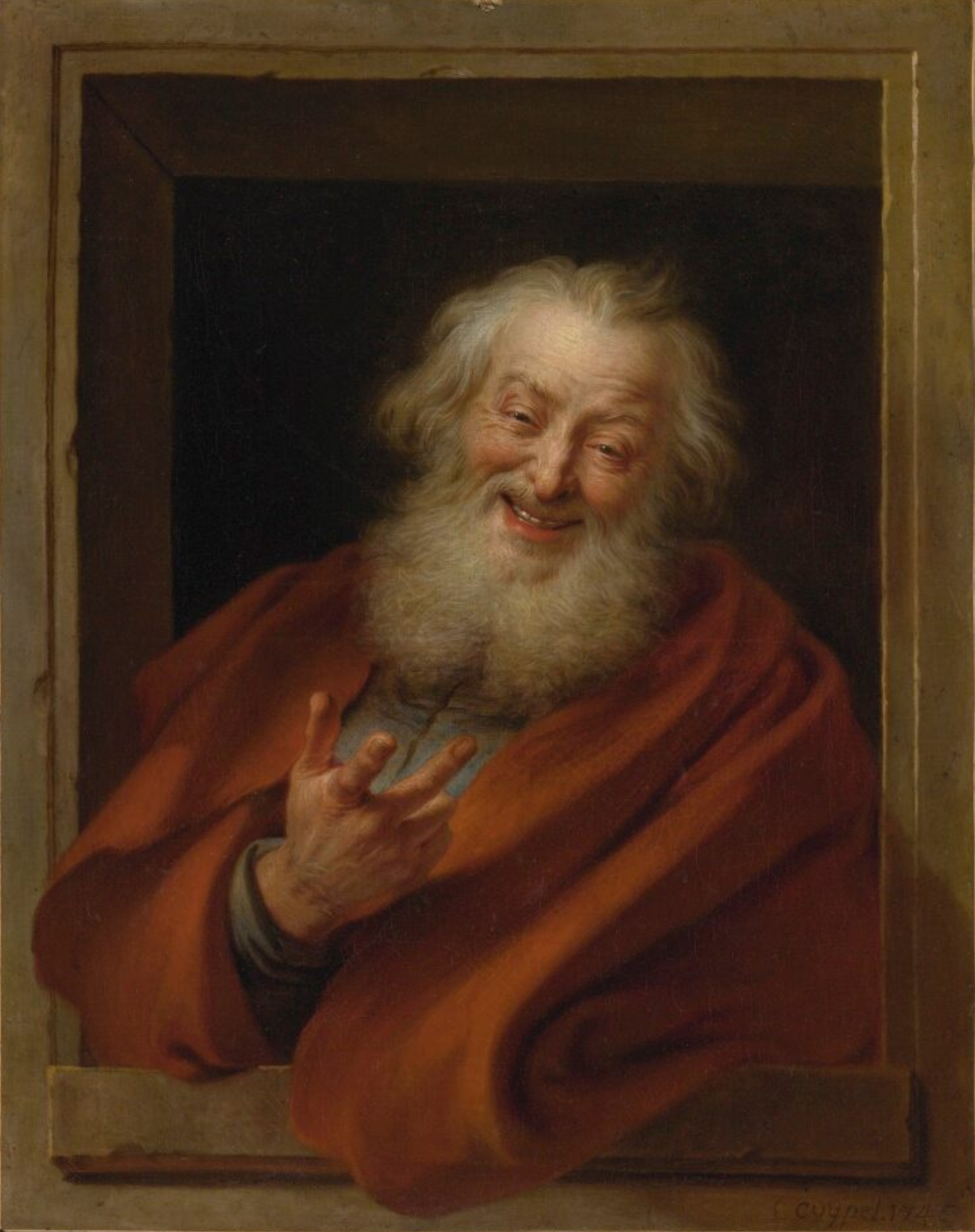
Charles-Antoine Coypel, Cheerful Democritus, 1746.

In his ethical philosophy Democritus considered the acquisition of peace of mind (εὐθυμία) as the end and ultimate object of our actions. This peace, this tranquillity of the mind, and freedom from fear (φόβος and δεισιδαιμονία) and passion, is the last and fairest fruit of philosophical inquiry. Many of his ethical writings referenced this idea and its establishment, and the fragments relating to this question are full of the most genuine practical wisdom. Abstinence from too many occupations, a steady consideration of one's own powers, which prevents our attempting that which we cannot accomplish, moderation in prosperity and misfortune, were to him the principal means of acquiring the εὐθυμία. The noblest and purest ethical tendency, lastly, is manifest in his views on virtue and on good. Truly pious and beloved by the gods, he says, are only those who hate that which is wrong (ὅσοις ἐχθρὸν τὸ ἀδικεῖν). The purest joy and the truest happiness are only the fruit of the higher mental activity exerted in the endeavour to understand the nature of things, of the peace of mind arising from good actions, and of a clear conscience.

Democritus was eloquent on ethical topics. Some sixty pages of his fragments, as recorded in Diels–Kranz, are devoted to moral counsel. The ethics and politics of Democritus come to us mostly in the form of maxims. In placing the quest for happiness at the center of moral philosophy, he was followed by almost every moralist of antiquity. The most common maxims associated with him are "Accept favours only if you plan to do greater favours in return", and he is also believed to impart some controversial advice such as "It is better not to have any children, for to bring them up well takes great trouble and care, and seeing them grow up badly is the cruellest of all pains". He also wrote a treatise on the purpose of life and the nature of happiness. He held that "happiness was not to be found in riches but in the goods of the soul and one should not take pleasure in mortal things". Another saying that is often attributed to him is "The hopes of the educated were better than the riches of the ignorant". He also stated that "the cause of sin is ignorance of what is better", which become a central notion later in the Socratic moral thought. Another idea he propounded which was later echoed in the Socratic moral thought was the maxim that "you are better off being wronged than doing wrong". His other moral notions went contrary to the then prevalent views such as his idea that "A good person not only refrains from wrongdoing but does not even want to do wrong", for the generally held notion back then was that virtue reaches its apex when it triumphs over conflicting human passions.

=== Aesthetics ===
Later Greek historians consider Democritus to have established aesthetics as a subject of investigation and study, as he wrote theoretically on poetry and fine art long before authors such as Aristotle. Specifically, Thrasyllus identified six works in the philosopher's oeuvre which had belonged to aesthetics as a discipline, but only fragments of the relevant works are extant; hence of all Democritus writings on these matters, only a small percentage of his thoughts and ideas can be known.

== Works ==
Of the extent of his knowledge, which embraced not only natural sciences, mathematics, mechanics (Brandis, in the Rhein. Mus. iii. p. 134, &c.), grammar, music, and philosophy, but various other useful arts, we may form some notion from the list of his numerous works which is given by Diogenes Laertius (9.46-49), and which, as Diogenes expressly states, contains only his genuine works. The grammarian Thrasyllus, a contemporary of the emperor Tiberius, arranged them, like the works of Plato, into tetralogies. Unfortunately, not one of his works has come down to us, and the treatise which we possess under his name is considered spurious. Callimachus wrote glosses upon his works and made a list of them; but they must have been lost at an early time, since even Simplicius, writing in the 6th century AD, does not appear to have read them, and since comparatively few fragments have come down to us, and these fragments refer more to ethics than to physical matters.

Diogenes Laertius attributes several works to Democritus, but none of them have survived in a complete form.

Ethics
Pythagoras, On the Disposition of the Wise Man, On the Things in Hades, Tritogenia, On Manliness or On Virtue, The Horn of Amaltheia, On Contentment, Ethical Commentaries
Natural science
The Great World-System, (Note: may have been written by Leucippus) Cosmography, On the Planets, On Nature, On the Nature of Man or On Flesh (two books), On the Mind, On the Senses, On Flavours, On Colours, On Different Shapes, On Changing Shape, Buttresses, On Images, On Logic (three books)
Nature
Heavenly Causes, Atmospheric Causes, Terrestrial Causes, Causes Concerned with Fire and Things in Fire, Causes Concerned with Sounds, Causes Concerned with Seeds and Plants and Fruits, Causes Concerned with Animals (three books), Miscellaneous Causes, On Magnets
Mathematics
On Different Angles or On contact of Circles and Spheres, On Geometry, Geometry, Numbers, On Irrational Lines and Solids (two books), Planispheres, On the Great Year or Astronomy (a calendar) Contest of the Waterclock, Description of the Heavens, Geography, Description of the Poles, Description of Rays of Light,
Literature
On the Rhythms and Harmony, On Poetry, On the Beauty of Verses, On Euphonious and Harsh-sounding Letters, On Homer, On Song, On Verbs, Names
Technical works
Prognosis, On Diet, Medical Judgment, Causes Concerning Appropriate and Inappropriate Occasions, On Farming, On Painting, Tactics, Fighting in Armor
Commentaries
On the Sacred Writings of Babylon, On Those in Meroe, Circumnavigation of the Ocean, On History, Chaldaean Account, Phrygian Account, On Fever and Coughing Sicknesses, Legal Causes, Problems

A collections of sayings credited to Democritus have been preserved by Stobaeus, as well as a collection of sayings ascribed to Democrates which some scholars including Diels and Kranz have also ascribed to Democritus.

== Legacy ==
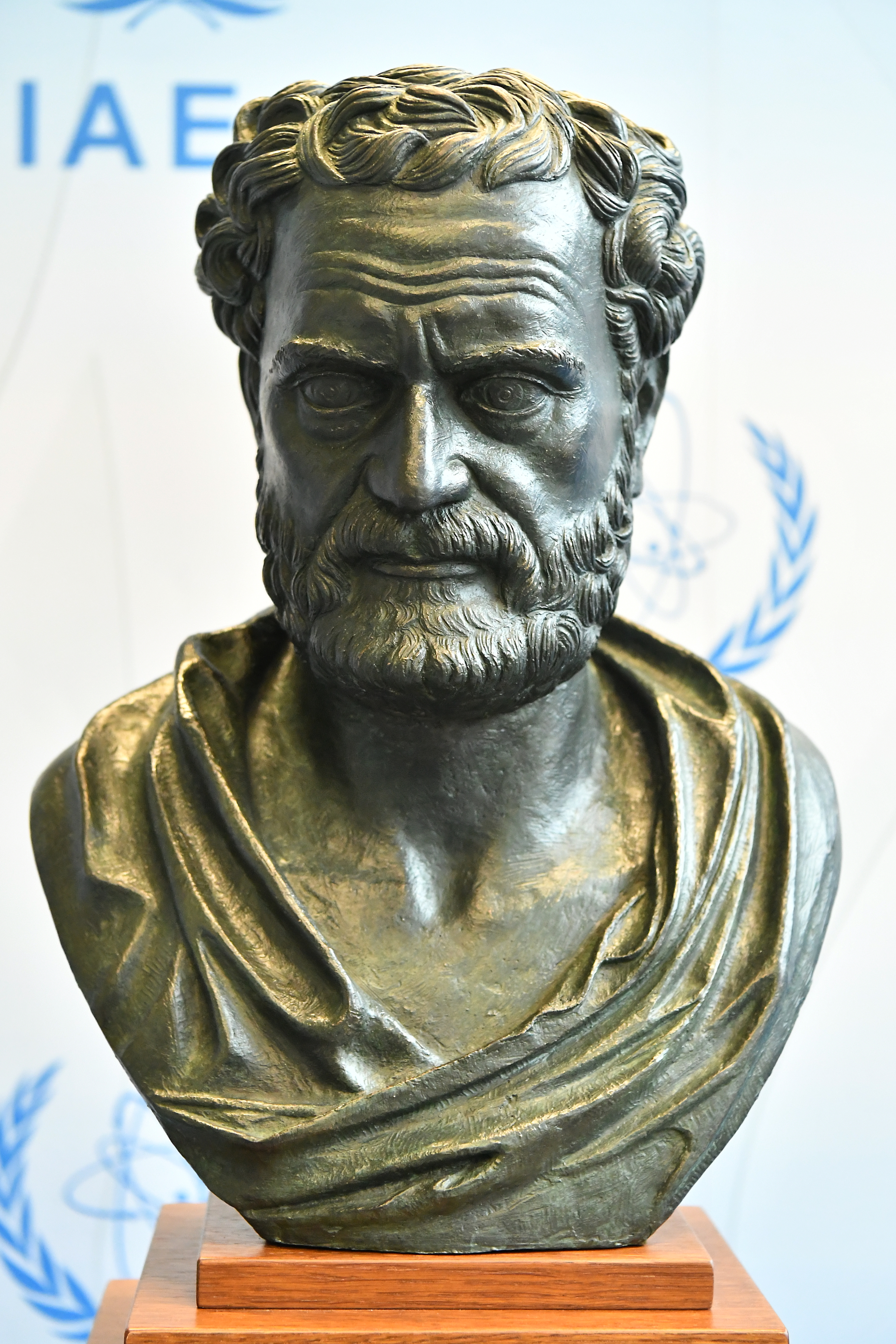
2020 bust of Democritus presented to the International Atomic Energy Agency by Greece

=== Classical antiquity ===
Diogenes Laertius claims that Plato disliked Democritus so much that he wished to have all of his books burned. (Note: Diogenes Laërtius, Lives and Opinions of Eminent Philosophers, ix. 40: "Aristoxenus in his Historical Notes affirms that Plato wished to burn all the writings of Democritus that he could collect.") He was nevertheless well known to his fellow northern-born philosopher Aristotle, and was the teacher of Protagoras. (Note: Diogenes Laertius, Lives of Eminent Philosophers Book IX, Chapter 8, Section 50.) The importance which was attached to the researches of Democritus is evident from the fact that Aristotle is reported to have written a work in two books on the problems of Democritus. His works were composed in the Ionic dialect, though not without some admixture of the local peculiarities of Abdera. They are nevertheless much praised by Cicero on account of the poetical beauties and the liveliness of their style, and are in this respect compared even with the works of Plato. Pyrrho is said to have imitated his style, and even Timon praises it, calling it περίφρονα καὶ ἀμφίνοον λέσχην.

=== Renaissance and early modern period ===
Democritus is evoked by English writer Samuel Johnson in his poem, The Vanity of Human Wishes (1749), ll. 49–68, and summoned to "arise on earth, /With chearful wisdom and instructive mirth, /See motley life in modern trappings dress'd, /And feed with varied fools th'eternal jest."

=== Modern atomism ===
The theory of the atomists appears to be more nearly aligned with that of modern science than any other theory of antiquity. However, the similarity with modern concepts of science can be confusing when trying to understand where the hypothesis came from. Classical atomists could not have had an empirical basis for modern concepts of atoms and molecules. The Democritean atom is an inert solid that excludes other bodies from its volume and interacts with other atoms mechanically. Quantum-mechanical atoms are similar in that their motion can be described by mechanics in addition to their electric, magnetic and quantum interactions. They are different in that they can be split into protons, neutrons, and electrons. The elementary particles are similar to Democritean atoms in that they are indivisible but their collisions are governed purely by quantum physics. Fermions observe the Pauli exclusion principle, which is similar to the Democritean principle that atoms exclude other bodies from their volume. However, bosons do not, with the prime example being the elementary particle photon.

=== "The Laughing Philosopher" ===
There is only one surviving fragment attributed to Democritus that mentions laughter:

Since we are human beings, it is right (axion) not to laugh (mê gelan) at the misfortunes of human beings (ep’anthrôpôn sumphorais), but to weep (olophuresthai).

The assertion of Democritus having a particular association with laughter existed by the time of Hippolytus of Rome.

He used to laugh at everything, as if all the things in human affairs were worthy of laughter (Houtos egela panta, hôs gelôtos axiôn pantôn tôn en anthrôpois).

He was given the nickname Gelasinos (Γελασῖνος, "Dimple" or "the Laughing One") because he was known for laughing at the empty ambition of human beings.

== See also ==
- Atom
- John Dalton
- Democritus (crater) on the Moon
- Democritus University of Thrace
- Kaṇāda
- Mochus
- National Centre of Scientific Research "Demokritos"
- Vaisheshika
