= Battle of the Pyramids, July 21, 1798 (study) =

Drawing by François-André Vincent

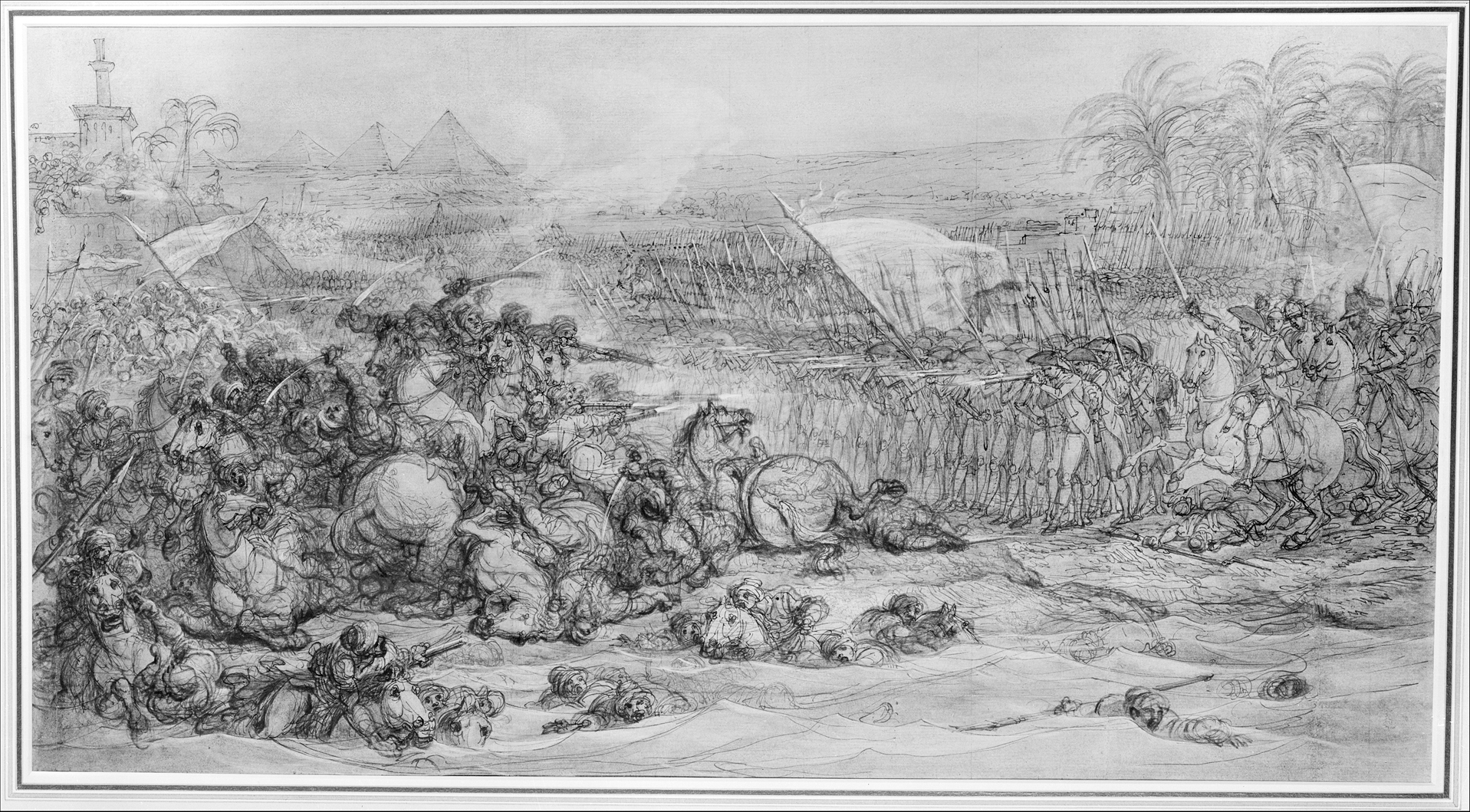
- Artist: François-André Vincent
- Year: c. 1800
- Medium: Ink and graphite on washed paper
- Dimensions: 41.8 cm × 75.1 cm (16.5 in × 29.6 in)
- Location: Metropolitan Museum of Art

Battle of the Pyramids, July 21, 1798 is an early 19th century drawing by French painter François-André Vincent. Done in black ink and graphite on washed paper, the study depicts the Battle of the Pyramids. The work is currently on display at the Metropolitan Museum of Art.

== Background ==
The painting depicts the pivotal Battle of the Pyramids, fought between the French Armée d'Orient under Napoleon Bonaparte and an army of Mamluk-controlled Egypt. The battle, fought on 21 July 1798, resulted in the near-destruction of the Mamluk army and the surrender of Cairo to the French. The victory caused elation in France, compounding the interest in Egypt (often referred to as first wave of "Egyptomania") that Napoleon's campaign in Egypt had already generated. This interest was in turn reflected in the art of turn of the century France, producing a number of works of art centered around Napoleon's military triumphs. The outbreak of the Napoleonic Wars ensured that this focus continued, as Napoleon's continued military success into the early 19th century ensured that French artists maintained their interest in depicting French martial glory.

The drawing was produced by François-André Vincent at the turn of the 18th century. The piece was a study, intended to allow for Vincent to form a general idea of an oil painting he planned to paint. At the time, Vincent was one of a group of artists commissioned by the French ministry of the interior to produce a series of six battlefield paintings. Vincent ultimately never produced a painting for the project.

== Description ==
Battle of the Pyramids portrays the titular battle as a flowing, energetic affair, while also ensuring that a visual distinction exists between French and Mamluk soldiers; while the Mamluk army is seen to be disorganized and chaotic, the French army is shown to be disciplined and orderly. The details of the battle are a reflection of historical reality, as during the engagement the Mamluk infantry and cavalry were repeatably repulsed by French line infantry with heavy losses. In addition, Vincent ensures that the exotic nature of the Mamluk horsemen, the banks of the Nile River, and the famous pyramids are all rendered in his work.
