= Zeuxis Choosing the Most Beautiful Women from Croton as His Models =

Painting by François-André Vincent

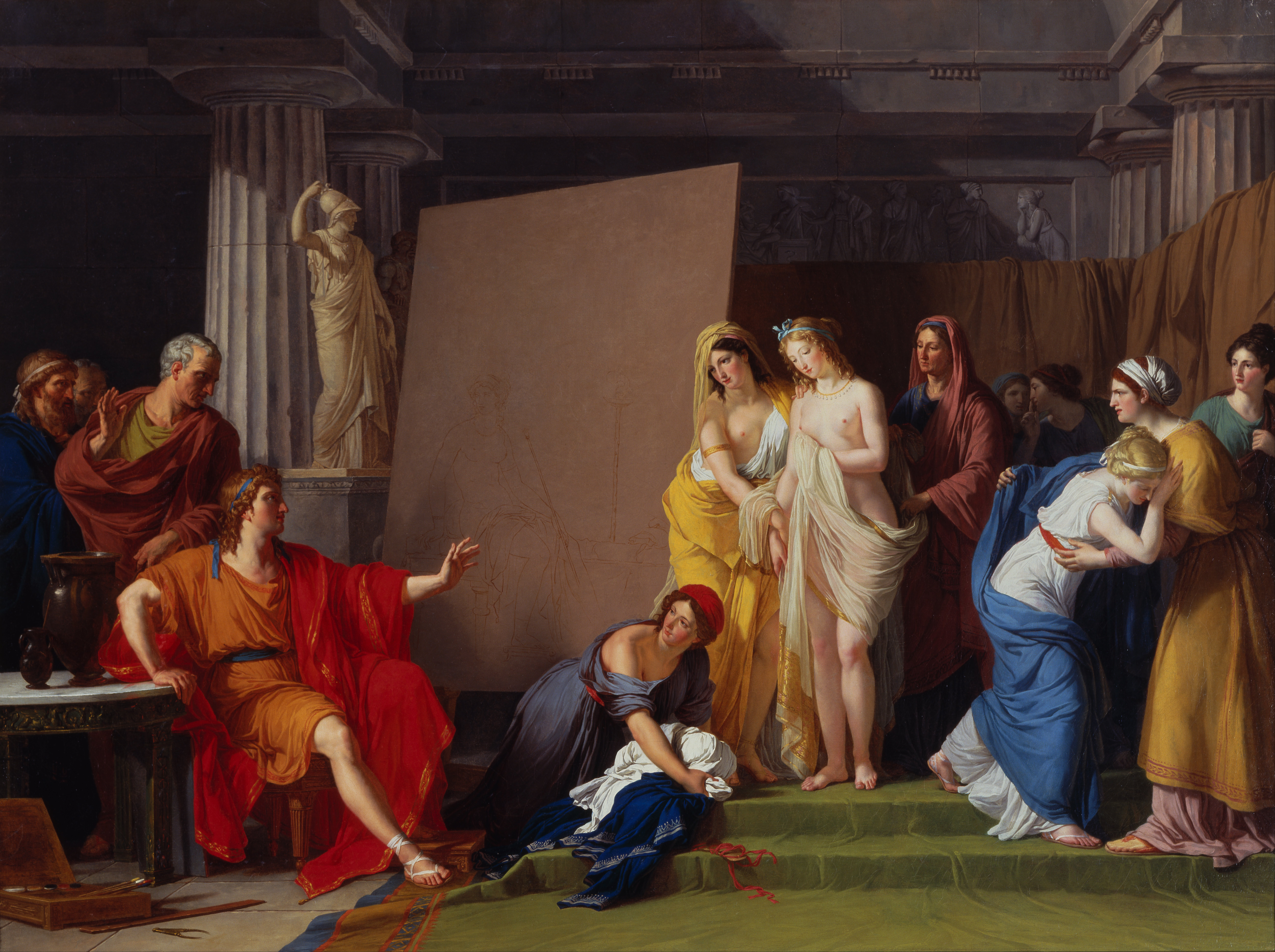
- Artist: François-André Vincent
- Year: 1789
- Type: Oil on canvas, history painting
- Dimensions: 323 cm × 415 cm (127 in × 163 in)
- Location: Louvre, Paris

Zeuxis Choosing the Most Beautiful Women from Croton as His Models is an oil on canvas history painting by the French artist François-André Vincent, from 1789.

Neoclassical in style, it depicts the Ancient Greek painter Zeuxis selecting an model from the women of the settlement of Crotone in Magna Graecia to pose as Helen of Troy. The scene is based on the writings of Pliny. Vincent had emerged as one of the outstanding artists of Ancien Regime France since the Salon of 1783.

The work appeared at both the Salon of 1789 and the Salon of 1791 held at the Louvre in Paris. Today it is in the collection of the Louvre. Another smaller, version of the painting is in the collection of the Cantor Arts Center of Stanford University in California.

== Bibliography ==
- Marvin, Miranda. The Language of the Muses: The Dialogue Between Roman and Greek Sculpture. Getty Publications, 2008.
- Mirzoeff, Nicholas. Silent Poetry: Deafness, Sign, and Visual Culture in Modern France. Princeton University Press, 2019.
