= Democritus Among the Abderites =

Painting by François-André Vincent

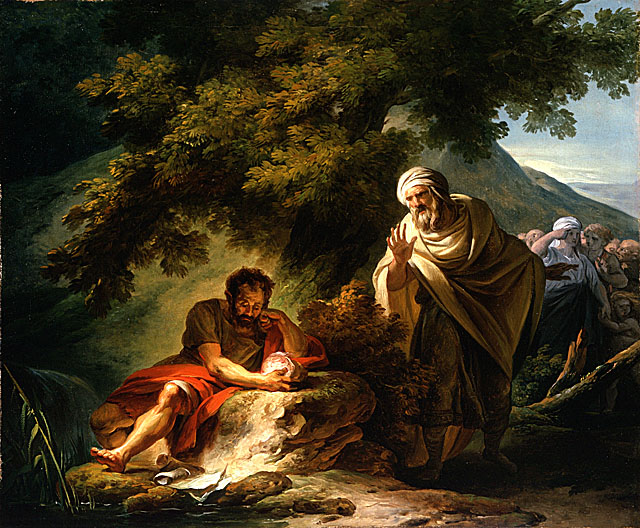
- Artist: François-André Vincent
- Year: c.1791
- Type: Oil on canvas, history painting
- Dimensions: 45.7 cm × 55.2 cm (18.0 in × 21.7 in)
- Location: County Museum of Art, Los Angeles

Democritus Among the Abderites is a 1791 history painting by the French artist François-André Vincent. It depicts a scene from Ancient Greek history in which the philosopher Democritus is shown in his native Abdera in the 5th Century BC. Democritus was known as the "laughing philosopher" for his belief in maintaining a cheerful attitude in the face of adversity. He was famously misunderstood and even mocked by the citizens, who found his manner eccentric and troubling Vincent almost certainly drew his inspiration for the painting from one of the Fables by Jean de La Fontaine.

Vincent was a leading Neoclassical artist who had been trained by Joseph-Marie Vien. He was a contemporary of Jacques-Louis David, with the two treated as both administrative and aesthetic rivals in the French art world. Following the French Revolution David became the figurehead of the more hardline Jacobin movement, Vincent was associated with more moderate wing. This painting has been described as a "visual riposte to Jacobinism".

The painting was exhibited at the Salon of 1791 held at the Louvre in Paris. Today it is in the collection of the Los Angeles County Museum of Art in California which acquired it in 2000.

== Bibliography ==
- Mansfield, Elizabeth C. The Perfect Foil: François-André Vincent and the Revolution in French Painting. University of Minnesota Press, 2011.
- Rosenthal, Donald A. La Grande Manière: Historical and Religious Painting in France, 1700-1800. Memorial Art Gallery of the University of Rochester, 1987.
