= Germanicus Calms Sedition in his Camp =

Painting by François-André Vincent

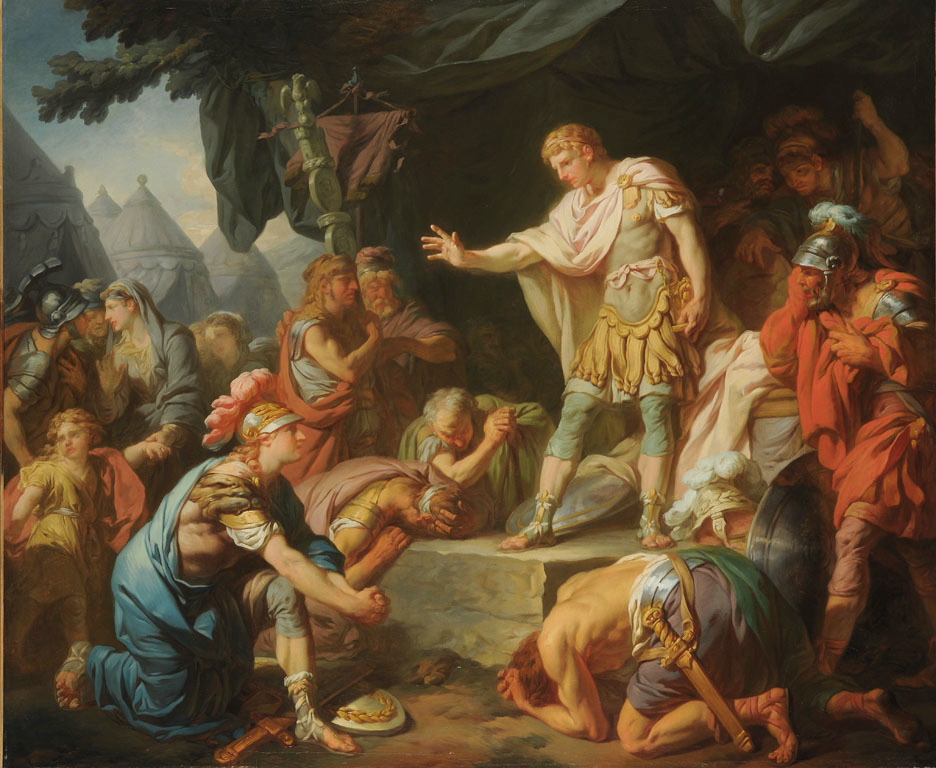
- Artist: François-André Vincent
- Year: 1768
- Dimensions: 119.5 cm (47.0 in) × 145 cm (57 in)
- Location: Beaux-Arts de Paris, France
- Accession no.: PRP 15

Germanicus Calms Sedition in his Camp is a 1768 oil on canvas painting by François-André Vincent, now in the École nationale supérieure des beaux-arts in Paris. Produced for a competition, the work won the first prize at the Académie royale and the prix de Rome, both in 1768. According to the artist's wishes, it was assigned to the École nationale supérieure des beaux-arts.

The subject from Tacitus's Annals (I, 40–44) and Suetonius's Lives of the Caesars (5, 1) was that set by the Académie Royale for their 1768 competition; the Mercure de France for October 1768 commented that "by its noble energy, this subject forces the students to wise compositions that tragic scenes could not inspire in young heads already too highly elevated". Vincent's version shows Germanicus refusing his soldiers' offer to make him emperor instead of Tiberius after the death of Augustus, with Agrippina the Elder and the future Caligula to the left.
