= The Ploughing Lesson =

Painting by François-André Vincent

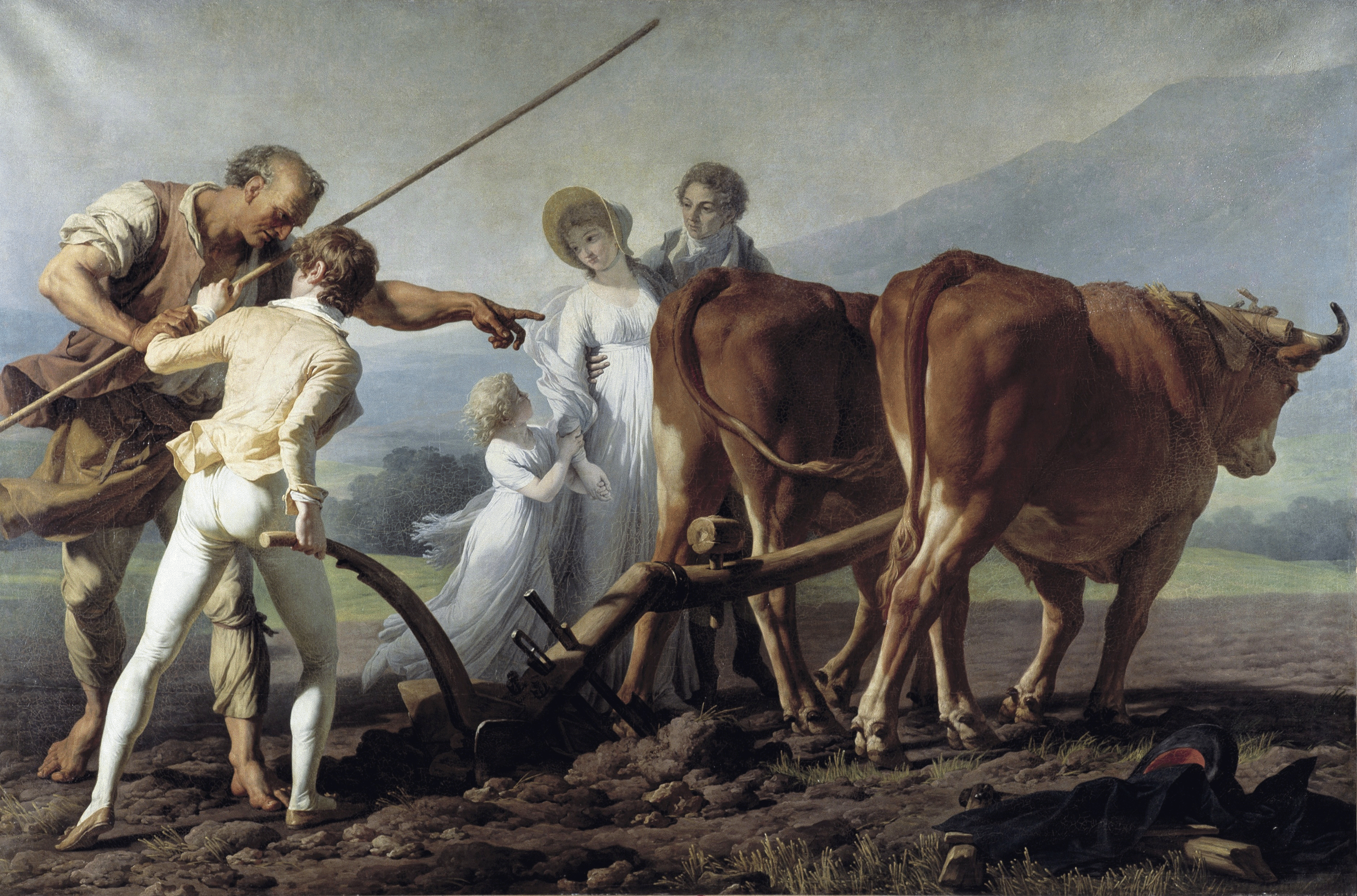
- Artist: François-André Vincent
- Year: 1798
- Type: Oil on canvas, genre painting
- Dimensions: 213 cm × 313 cm (84 in × 123 in)
- Location: Musée des Beaux-Arts, Bordeaux

The Ploughing Lesson (French: La Leçon de labourage) is an oil on canvas genre painting by the French artist François-André Vincent, from 1798.

It also features a series of portrait paintings as members of a wealthy family observe their son's lesson in ploughing, aligning with the belief that a knowledge of agriculture was of vital importance following the French Revolution. The Pyrenees are shown in the background.

Vincent was a noted Neoclassical artist who had won the Prix de Rome in 1768. Many of his paintings were historical scenes, but this is a more regular scene of everyday life. It was commissioned by the businessman Bernard BoyerIt was exhibited at the Salon of 1798 held at the Louvre in Paris. Today it is in the collection of the Musée des Beaux-Arts, in Bordeaux, having been acquired in 1830.

== Bibliography ==
- Mansfield, Elizabeth C. The Perfect Foil: François-André Vincent and the Revolution in French Painting. University of Minnesota Press, 2011.
- Shovlin, John. The Political Economy of Virtue: Luxury, Patriotism, and the Origins of the French Revolution. Cornell University Press, 2006.
