= François-André Vincent =

French painter (1746–1816)

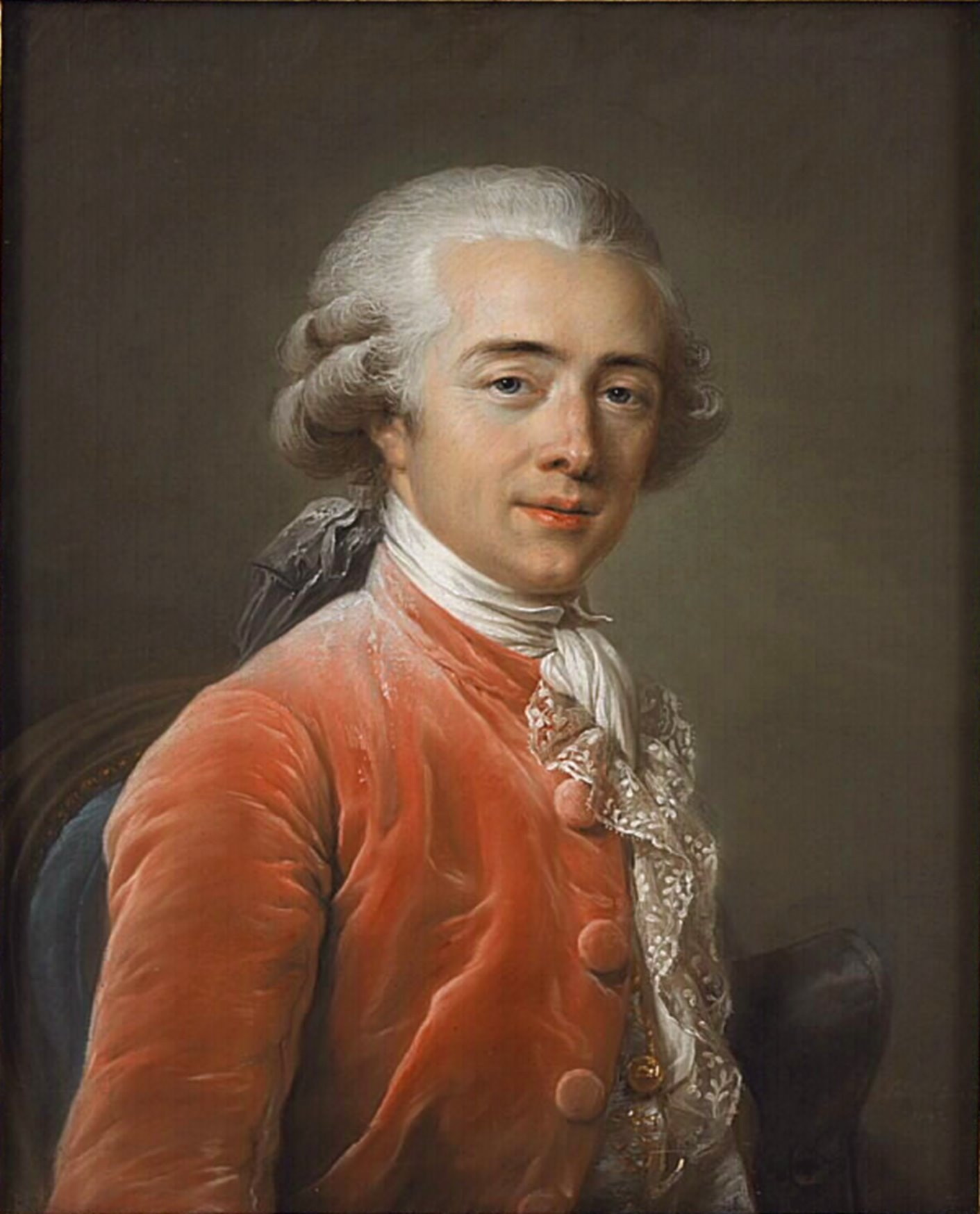
- Portrait of François-André Vincent by Adélaïde Labille-Guiard, painted 1783
- Born: 30 December 1746; Paris, France
- Died: 4 August 1816 (aged 69); Paris, France
- Occupation: Neoclassical painter
- Spouse: Adélaïde Labille-Guiard (m. 1799; died 1803)

Signature
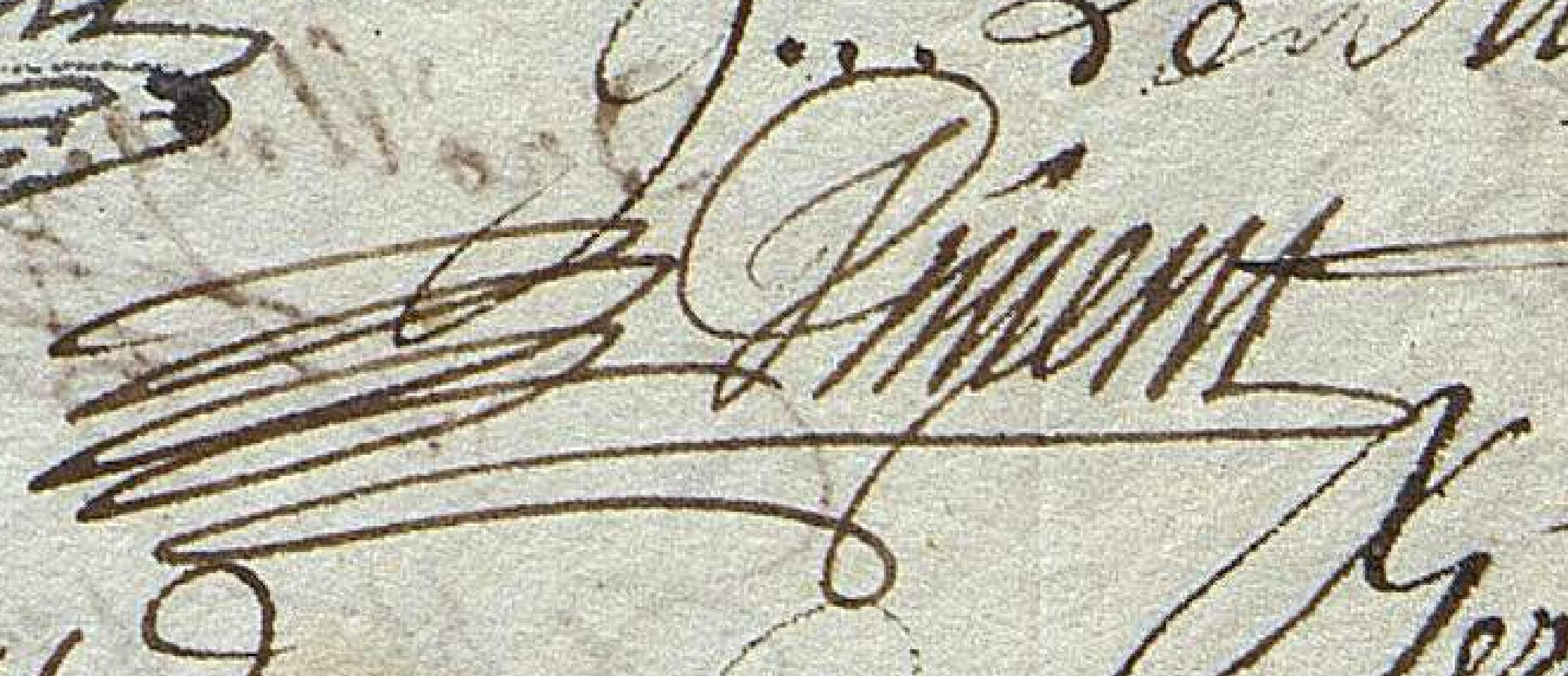

François-André Vincent (French pronunciation: [fʁɑ̃swa ɑ̃dʁe vɛ̃sɑ̃]; 30 December 1746 – 4 August 1816) was a French neoclassical painter.

== Biography ==
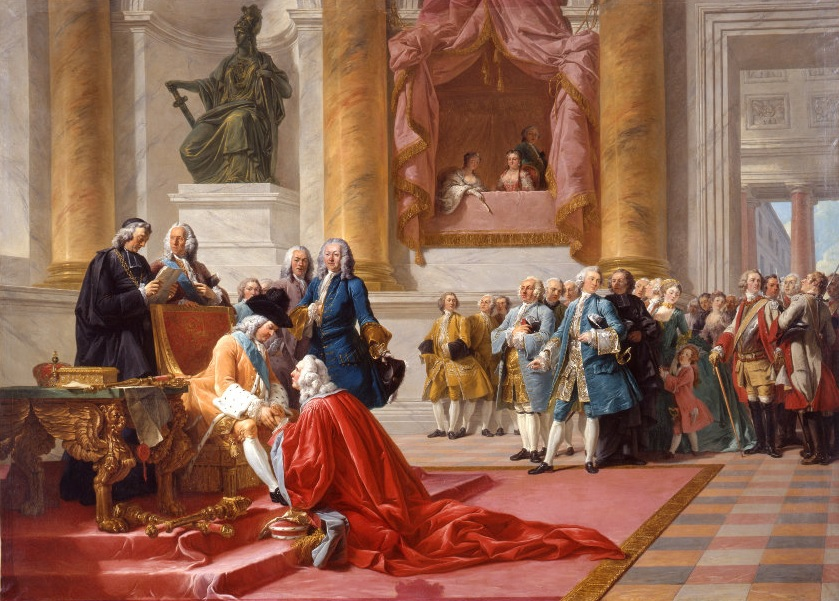
Chancellor Antoine Chaumont de La Galaizière receiving homage from the First President of the Court of Lorraine in Nancy on 21 March 1737

Vincent was born in Paris in 1746, the son of the miniaturist François-Elie Vincent. He studied under Joseph-Marie Vien and was a pupil of École Royale des Éleves Protégés. From 1771 to 1775 he studied at the French Academy in Rome. He travelled to Rome after winning the Prix de Rome with Germanicus Calms Sedition in his Camp in 1768, and was when he was installed at the Palais Mancini, where he painted numerous portraits, inspired by Jean-Honoré Fragonard's style, who also was visiting Rome and Naples in the same time.

In 1790, Vincent was appointed master of drawings to Louis XVI, and in 1792 he became a professor at the Académie royale de peinture et de sculpture in Paris. In 1800, he married the painter Adélaïde Labille-Guiard who was well known for her mastery in portrait painting, a member of the Royal Academy and painter for the Royal Family.

He was a leader of the neoclassical and historical movement in French art, along with his rival Jacques-Louis David, another pupil of Vien. He was influenced by the art of classical antiquity, by the masters of the Italian High Renaissance, especially Raphael. François-André Vincent was one of the principal innovators of the subjects and themes in French art of Neoclassical style and his works were of a high standard. He was one of the founder members of the Académie des Beaux-Arts – part of the Institut de France and the successor to the Académie royale – in 1795. Towards the end of his life he painted less due to ill health, but he continued to receive official honours.

== Works ==
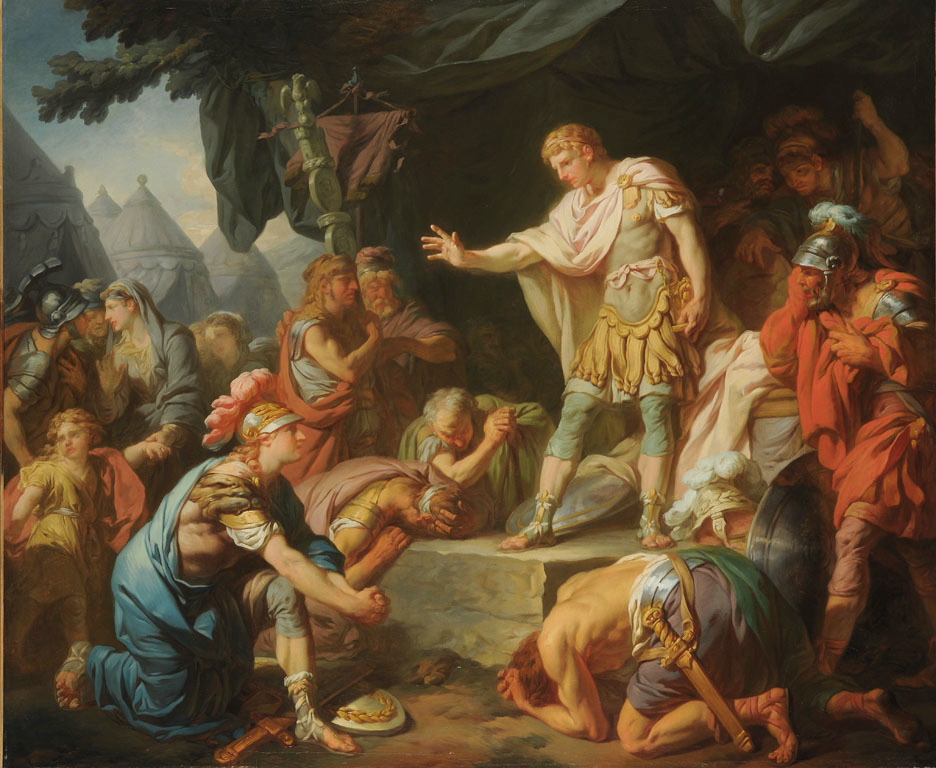
Germanicus Calms Sedition in his Camp, 1768

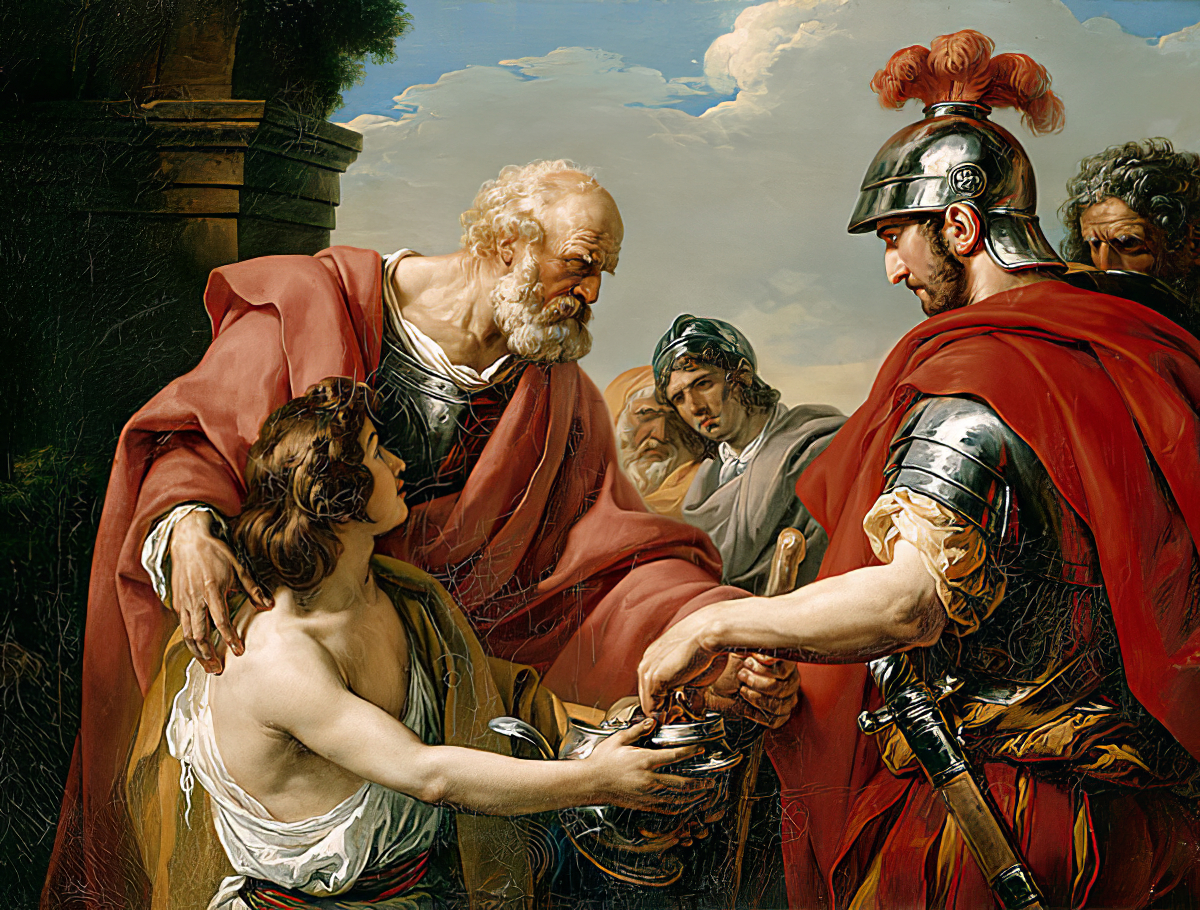
Belisarius, 1776

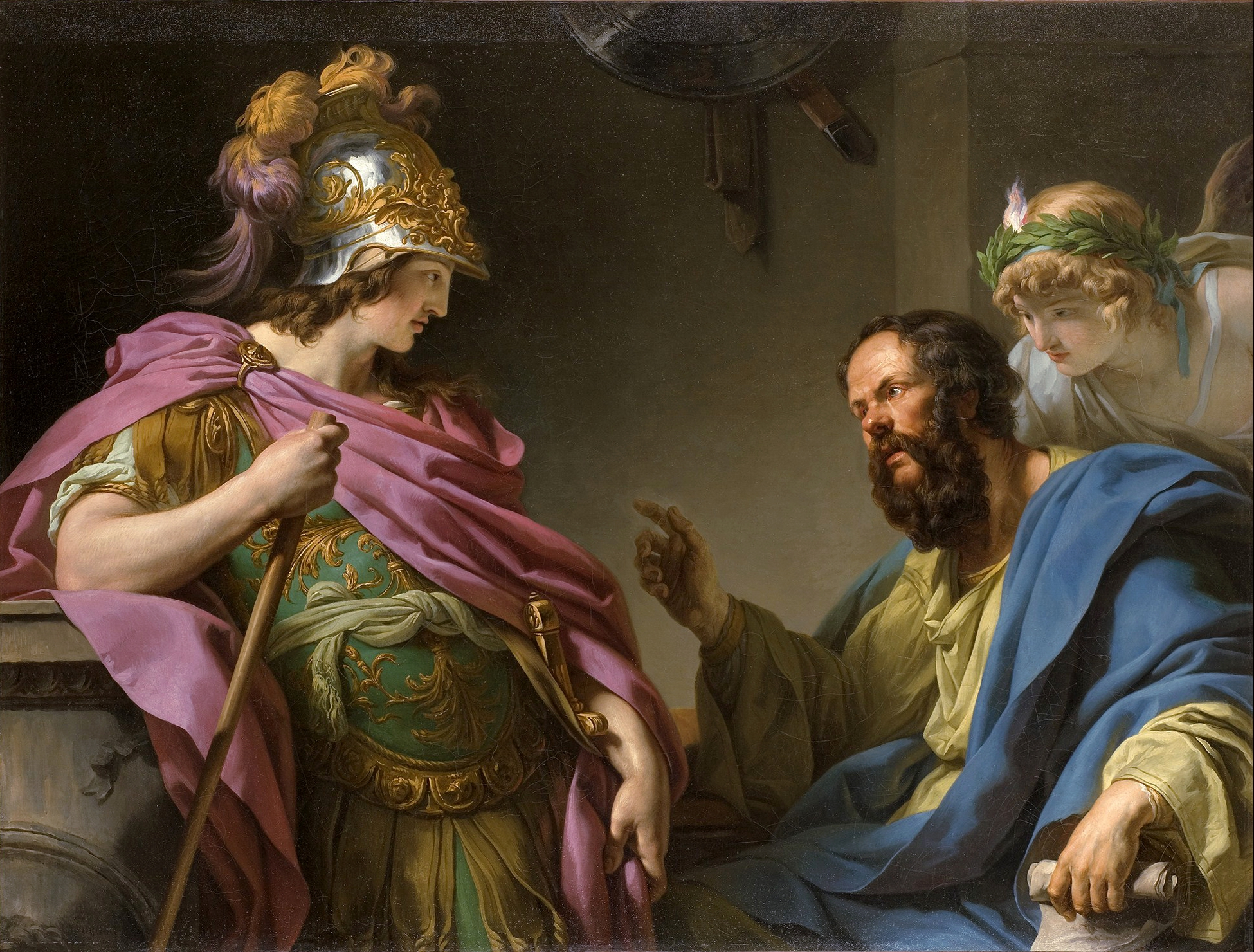
Alcibiades Being Taught by Socrates, 1777

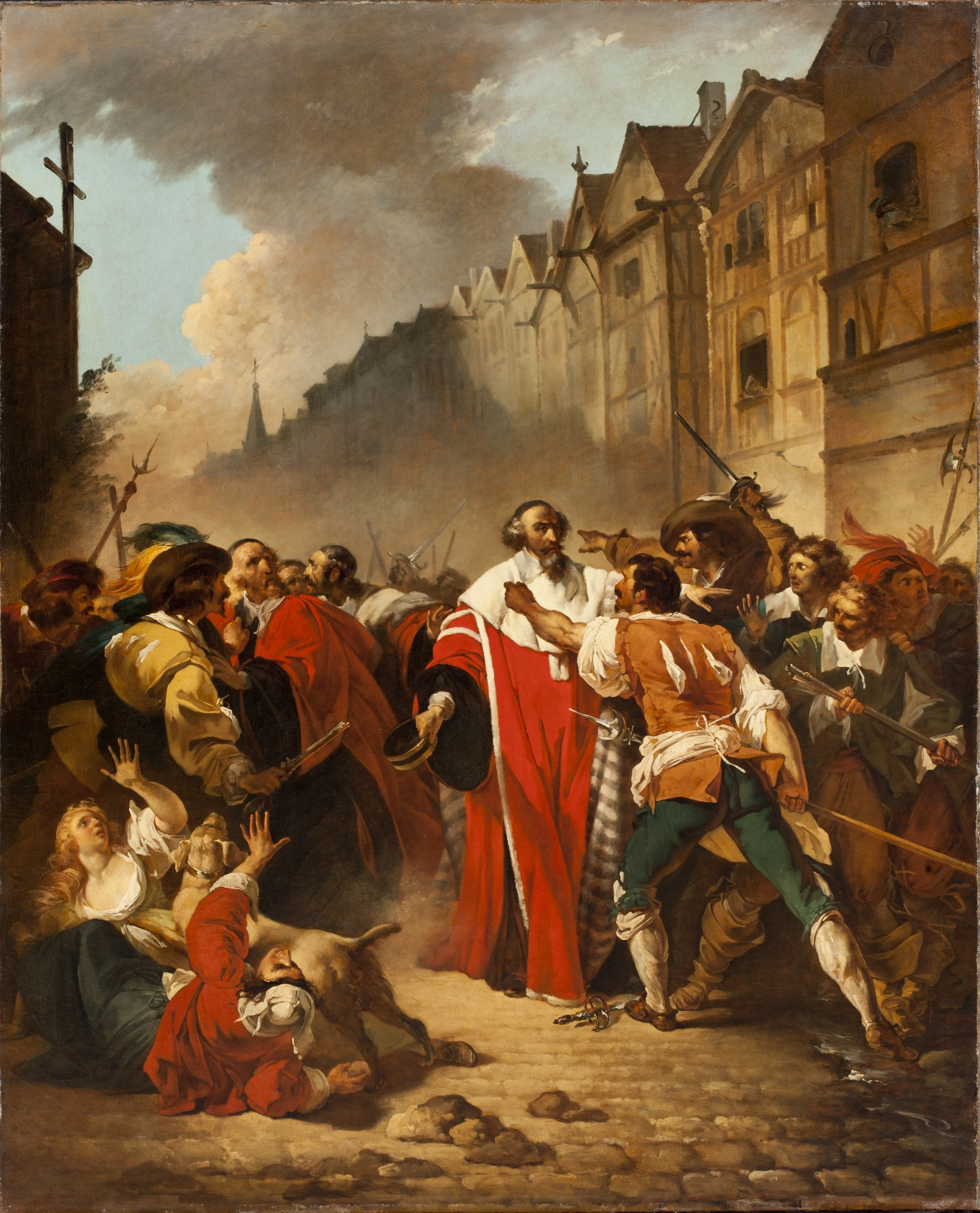
President Molé Confronted by Insurgents, 1779

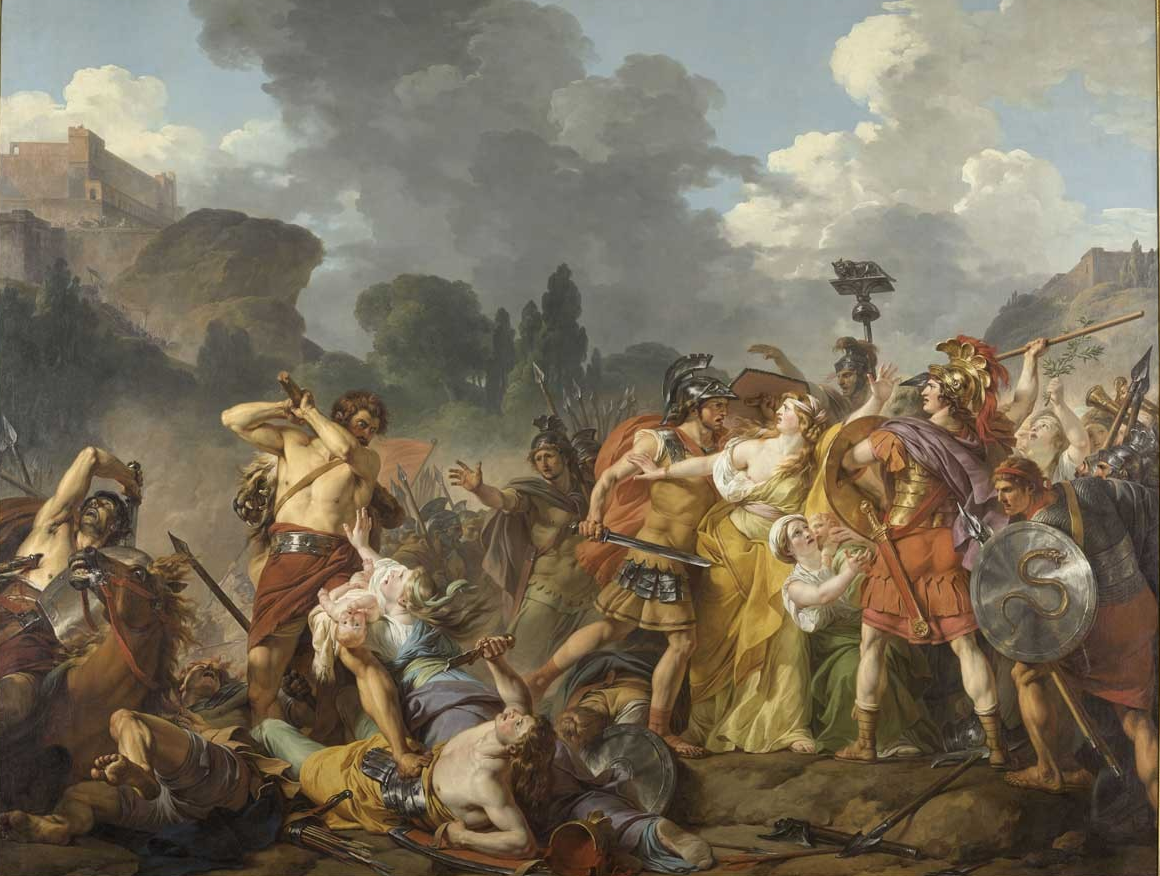
The Intervention of the Sabine Women, 1781

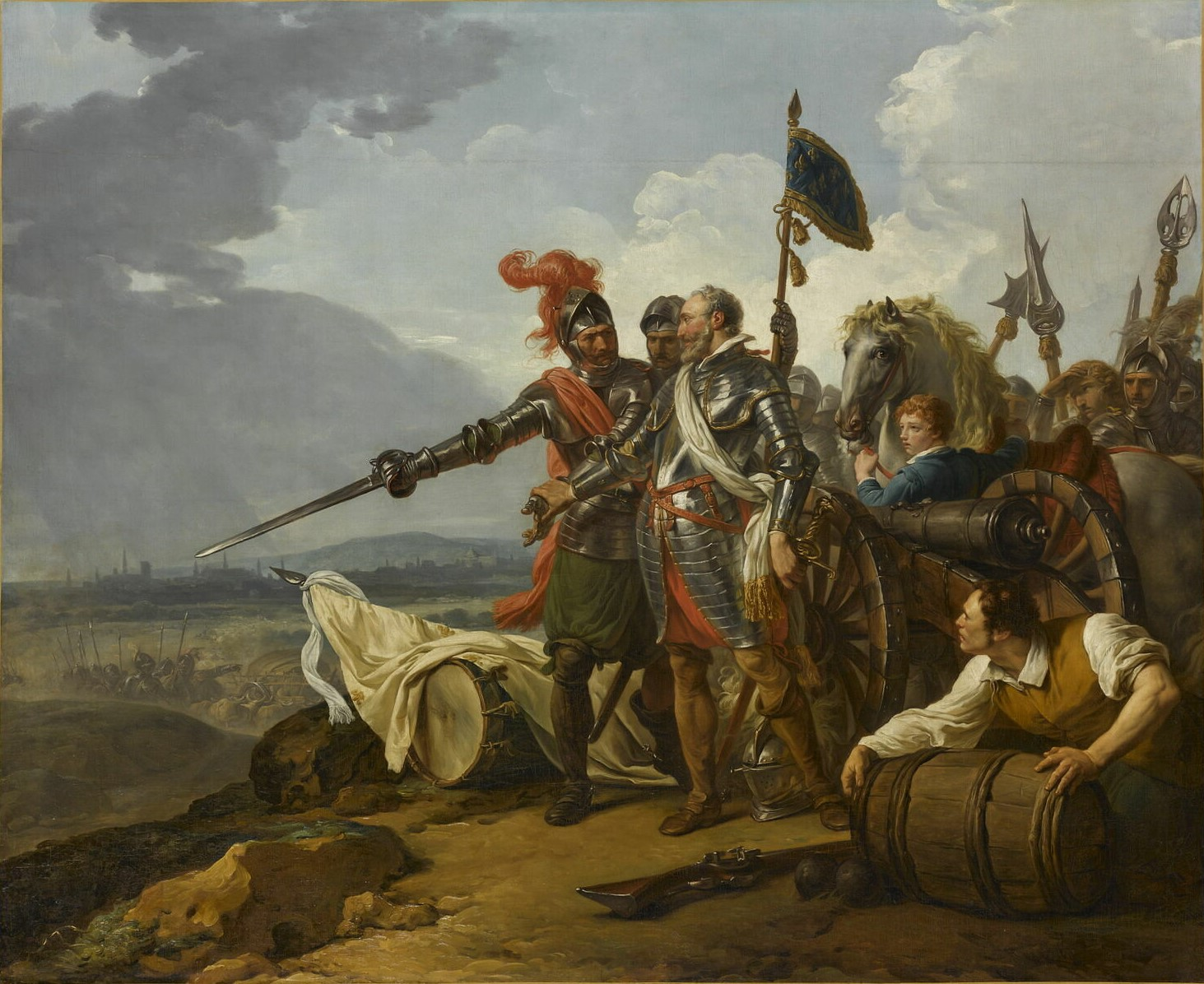
Henry IV Bringing Food into Paris, 1783

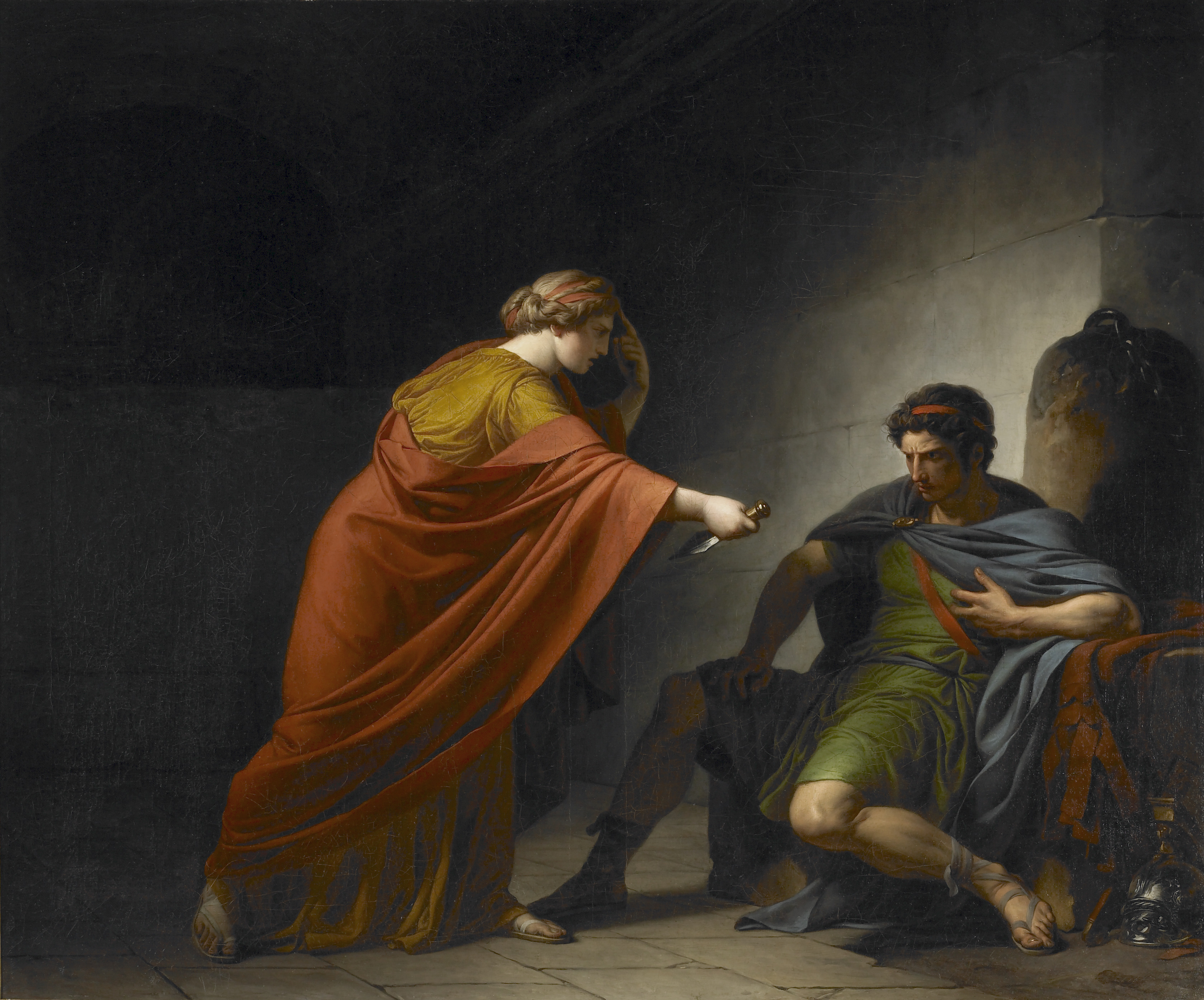
Arria and Paetus, 1784

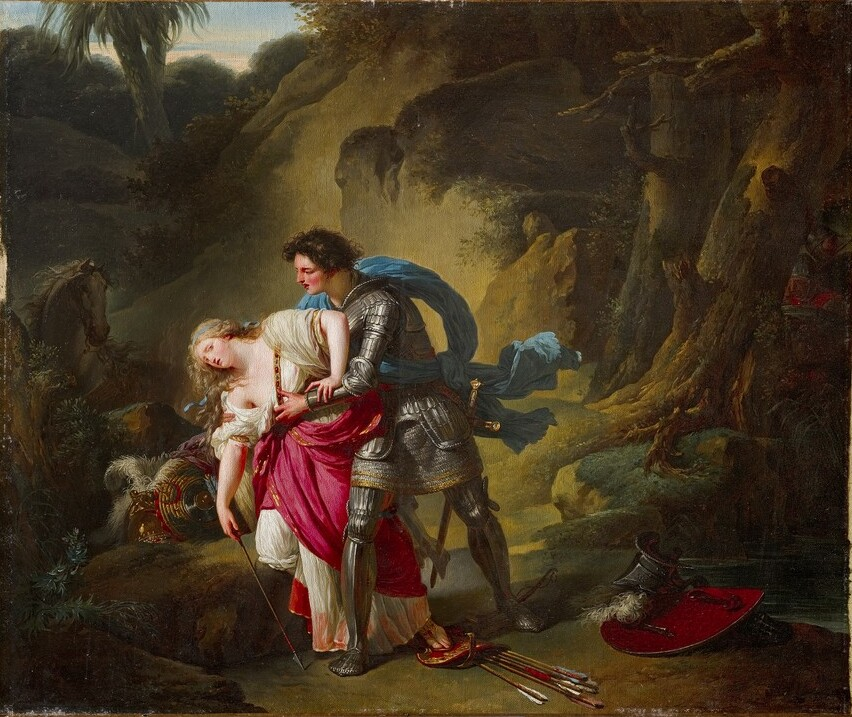
Renaud and Armida, 1787

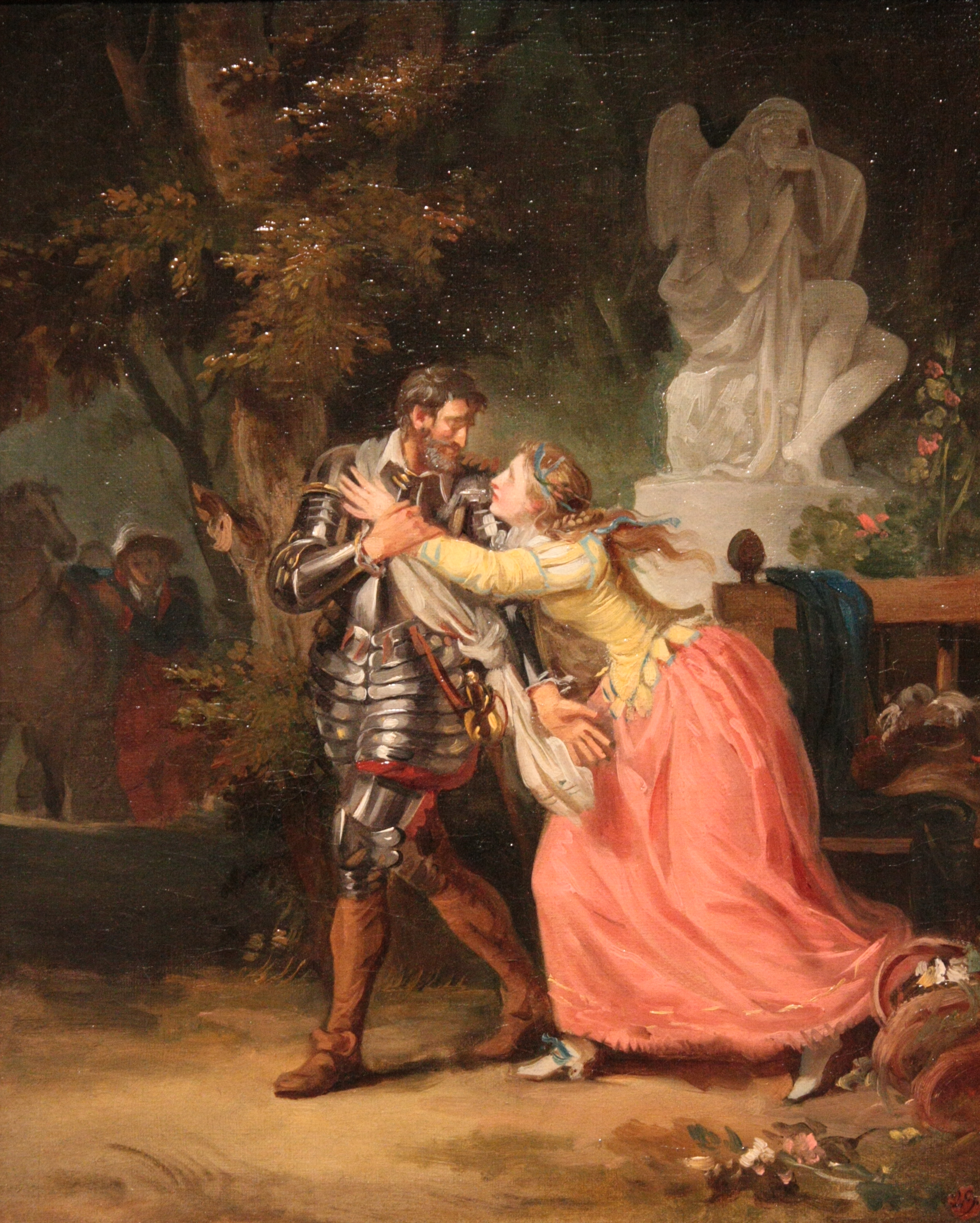
The Farewell of Henry IV and Gabrielle d'Estrées, 1787

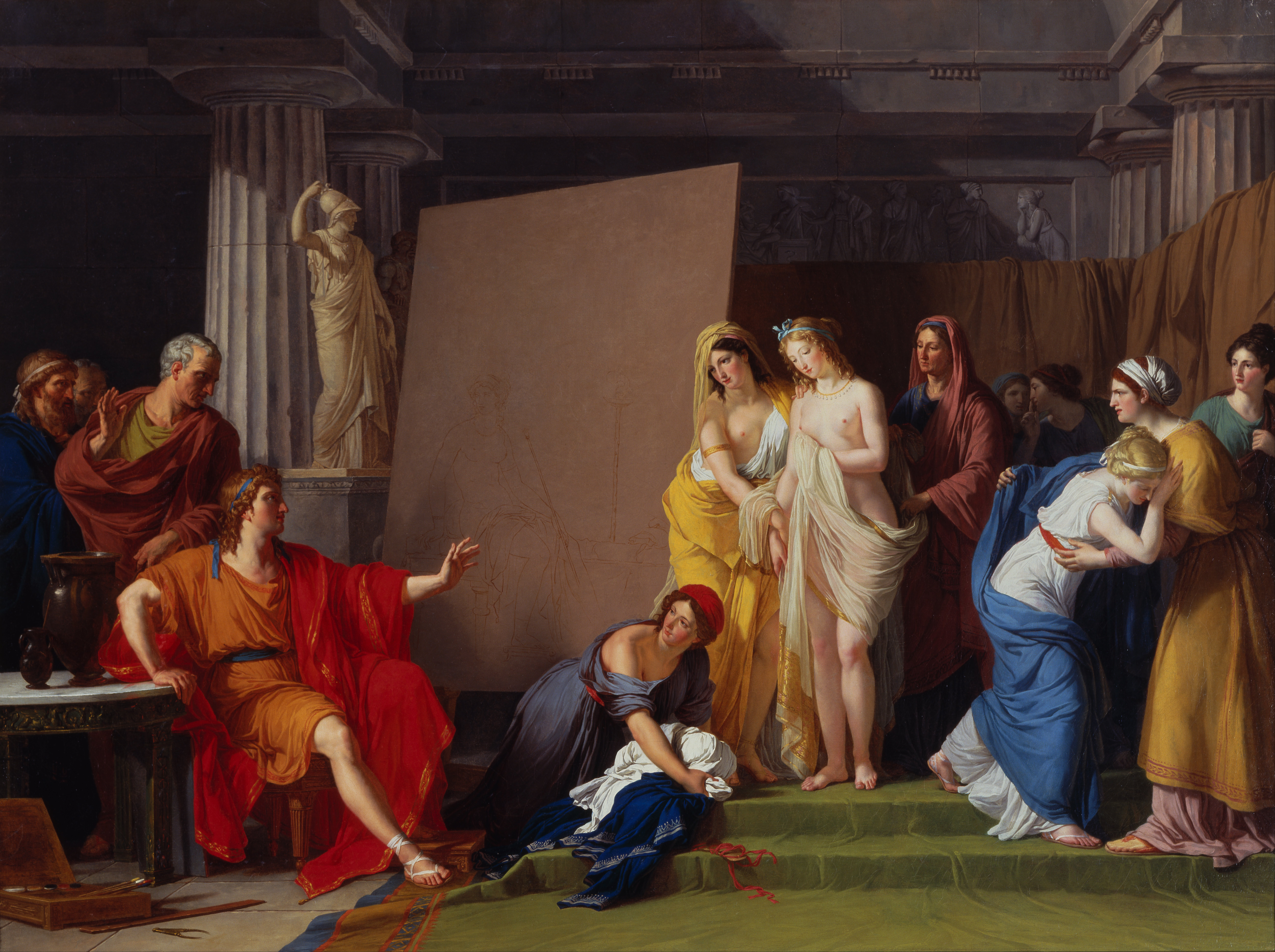
Zeuxis Choosing the Most Beautiful Women from Croton as His Models, 1789

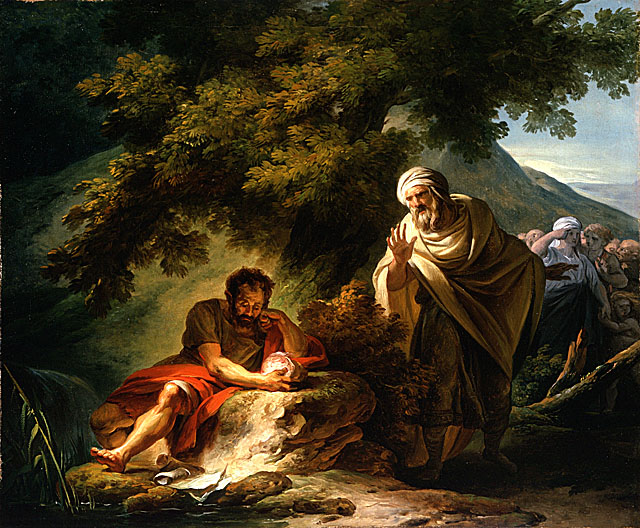
Democritus Among the Abderites, 1791

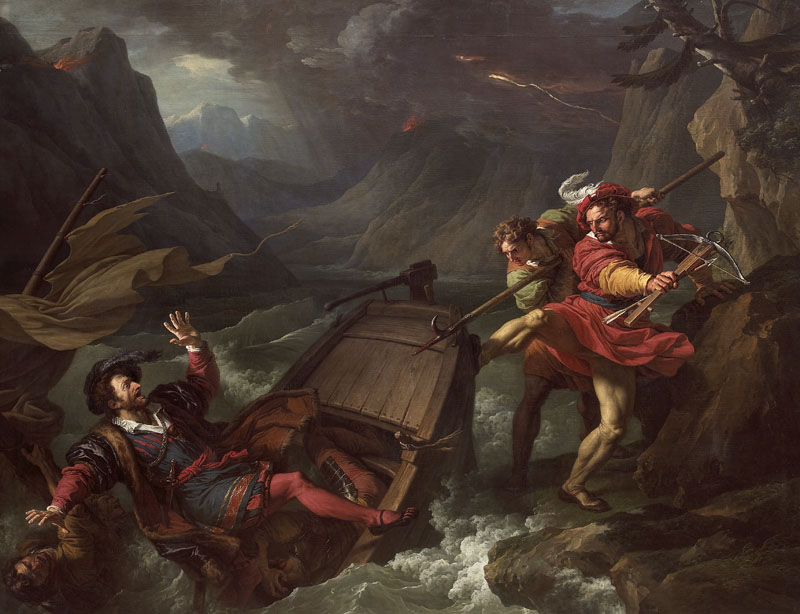
William Tell's Leap from the Boat of his Captors, 1791

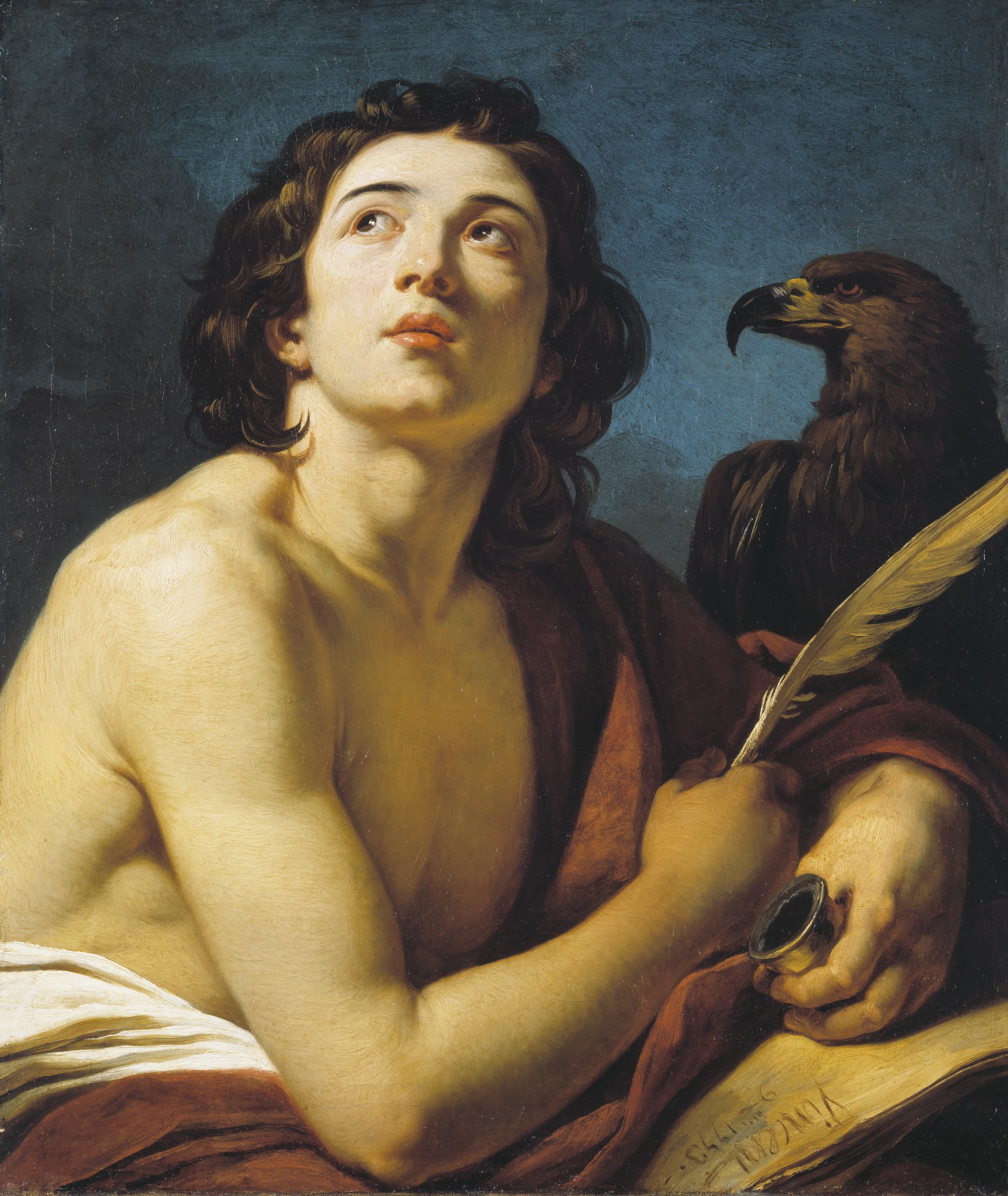
Saint John the Evangelist, 1793

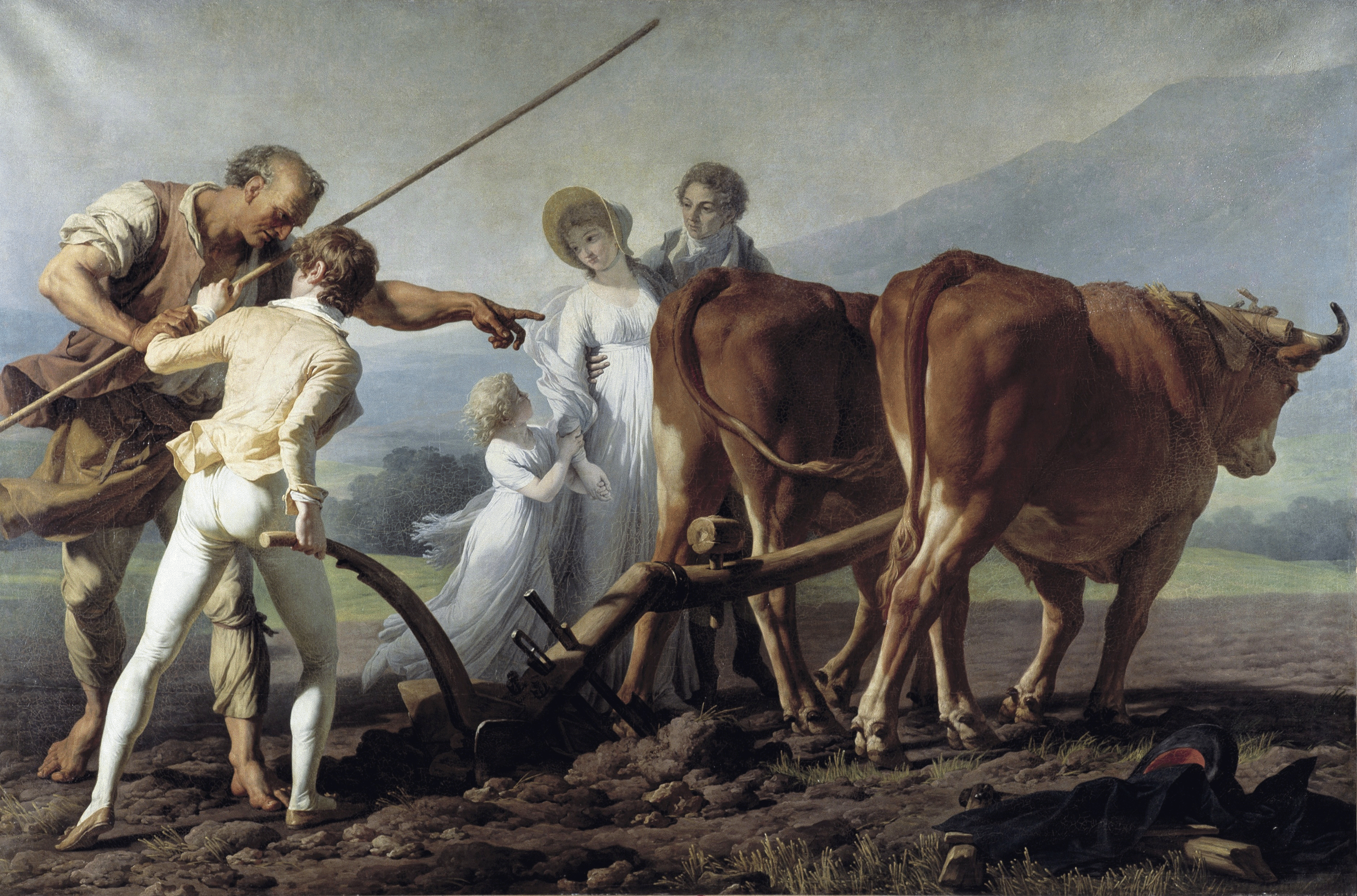
The Ploughing Lesson, 1798

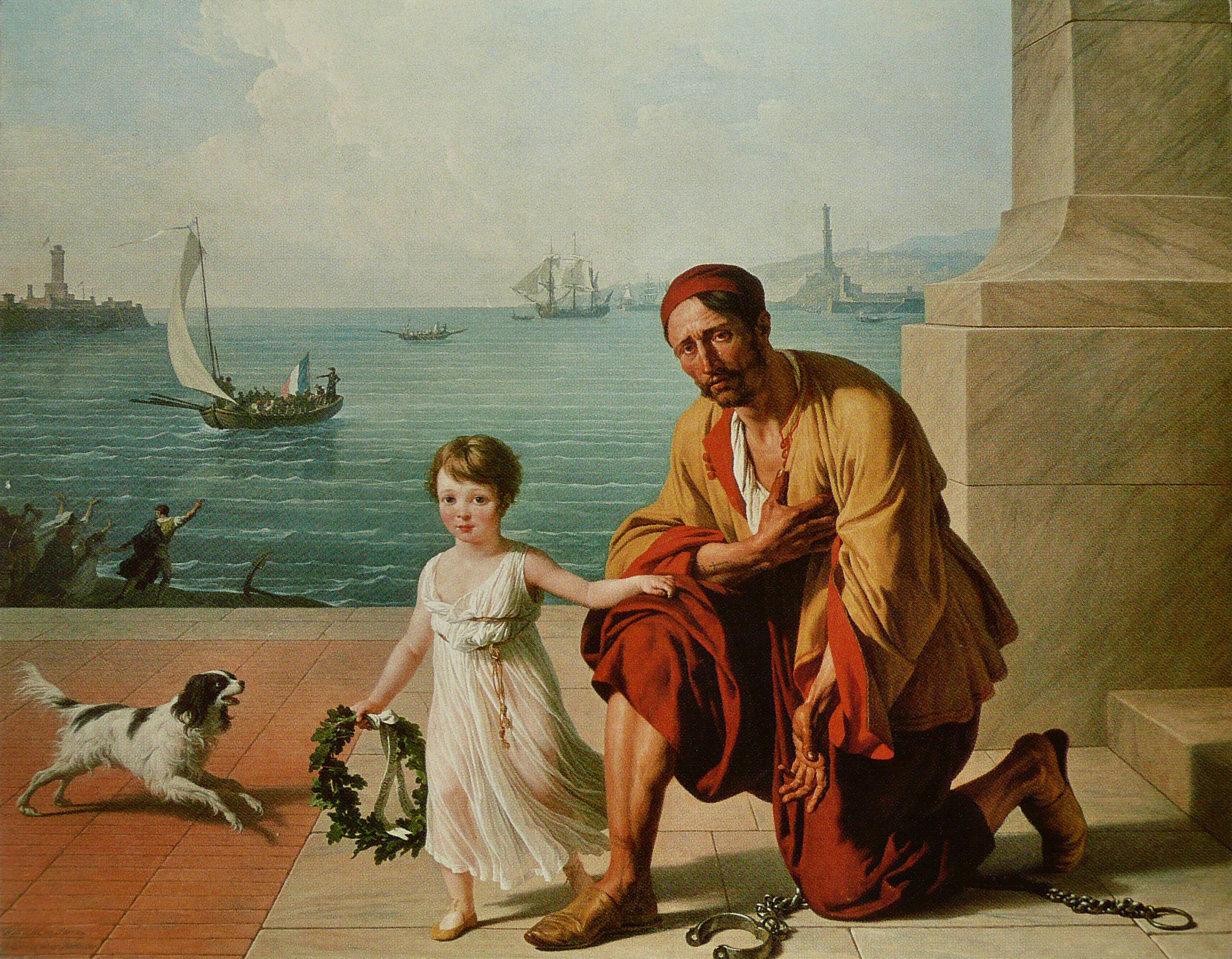
Allegory of Freedom for Ransomed Barbary Captives, 1806

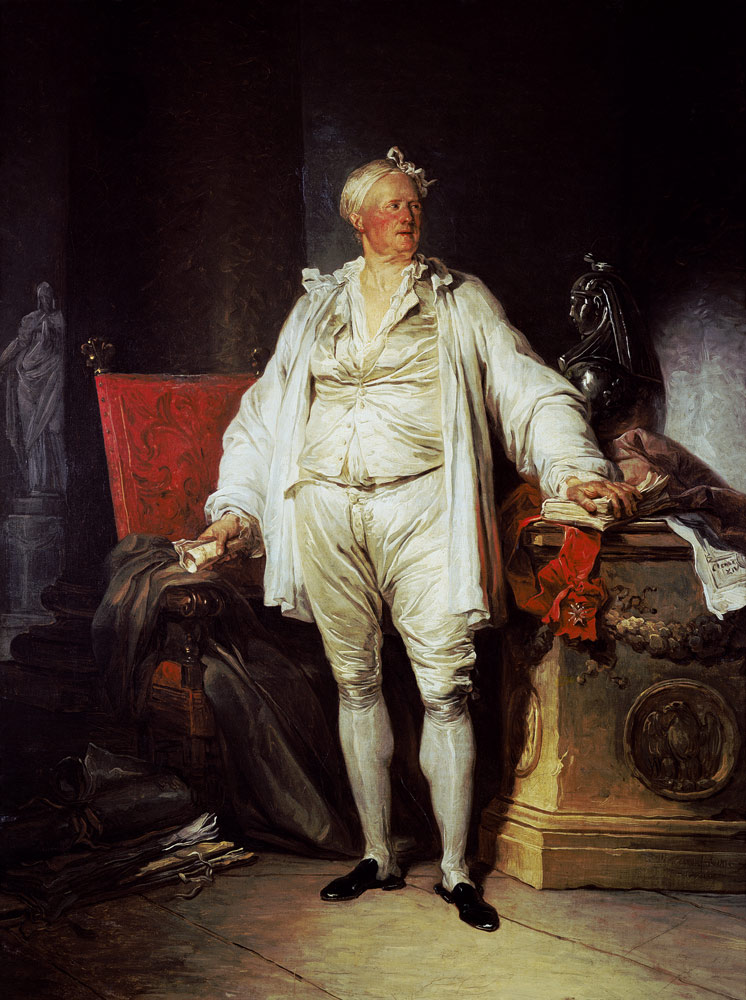
Portrait of Bergeret de Grancourt, 1774

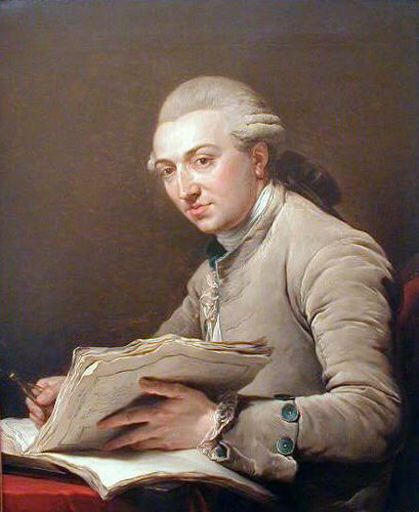
Pierre Rousseau, 1774

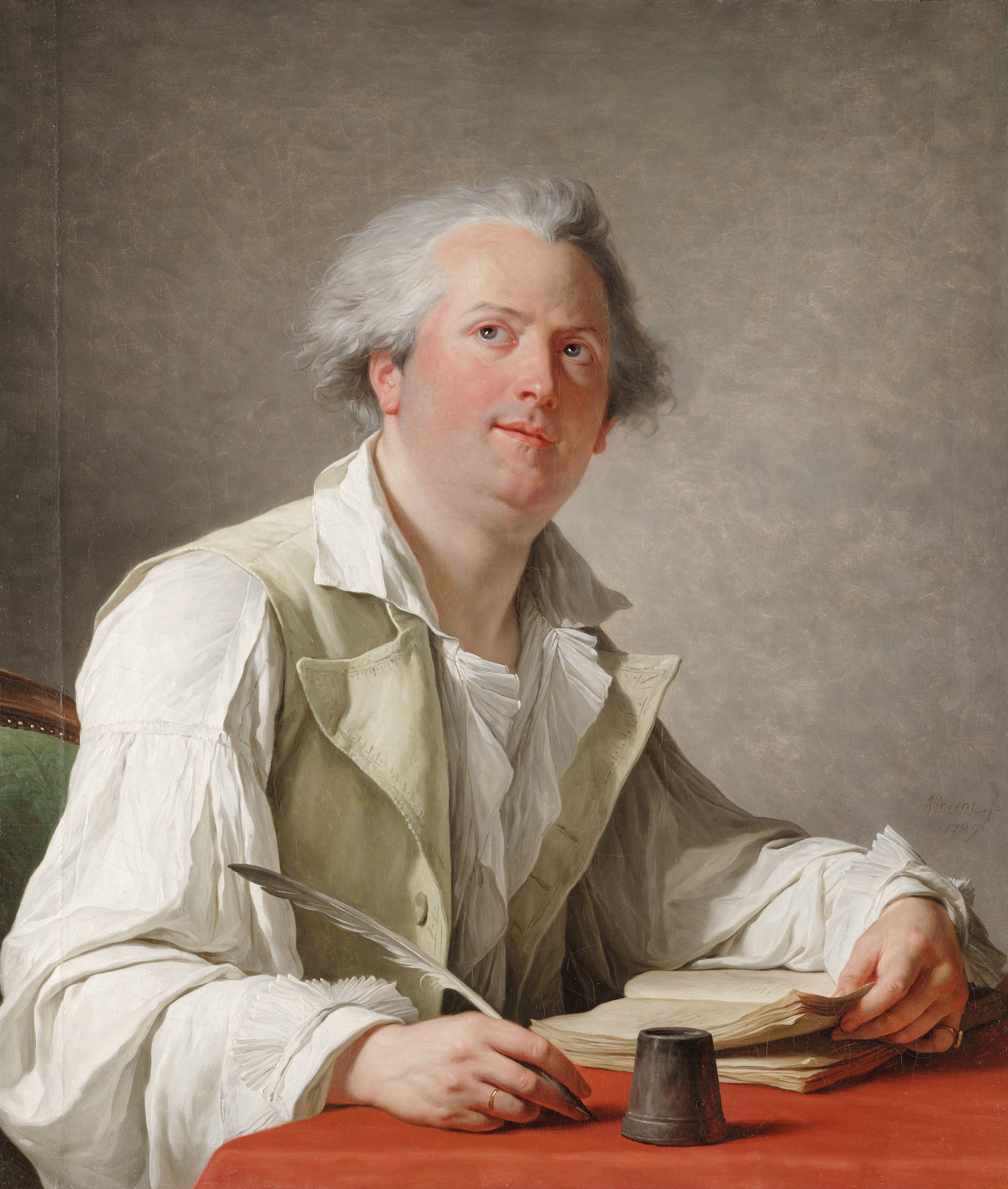
Pierre Jean Baptiste Choudard Desforges, 1789

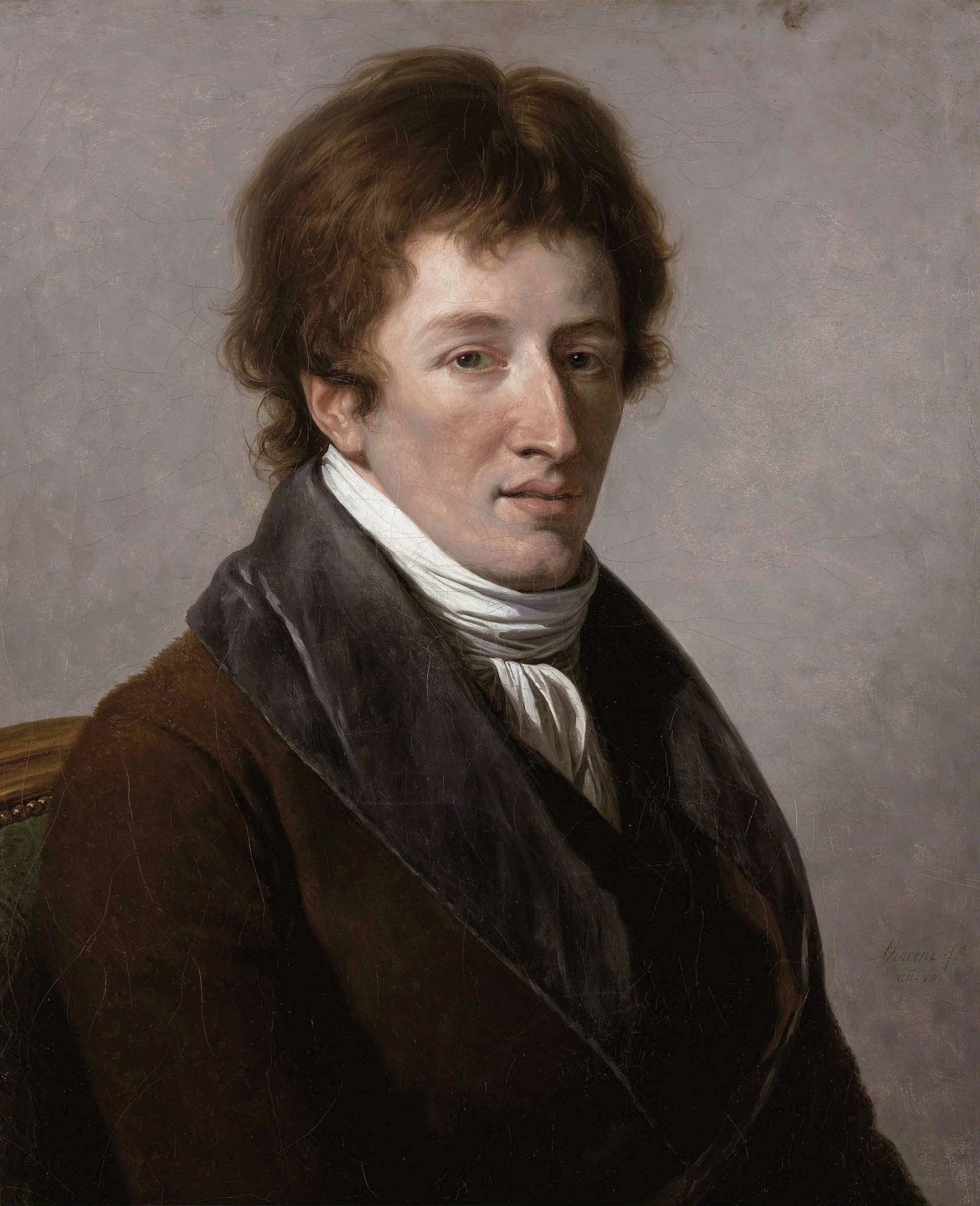
Portrait of Georges Cuvier, 1795

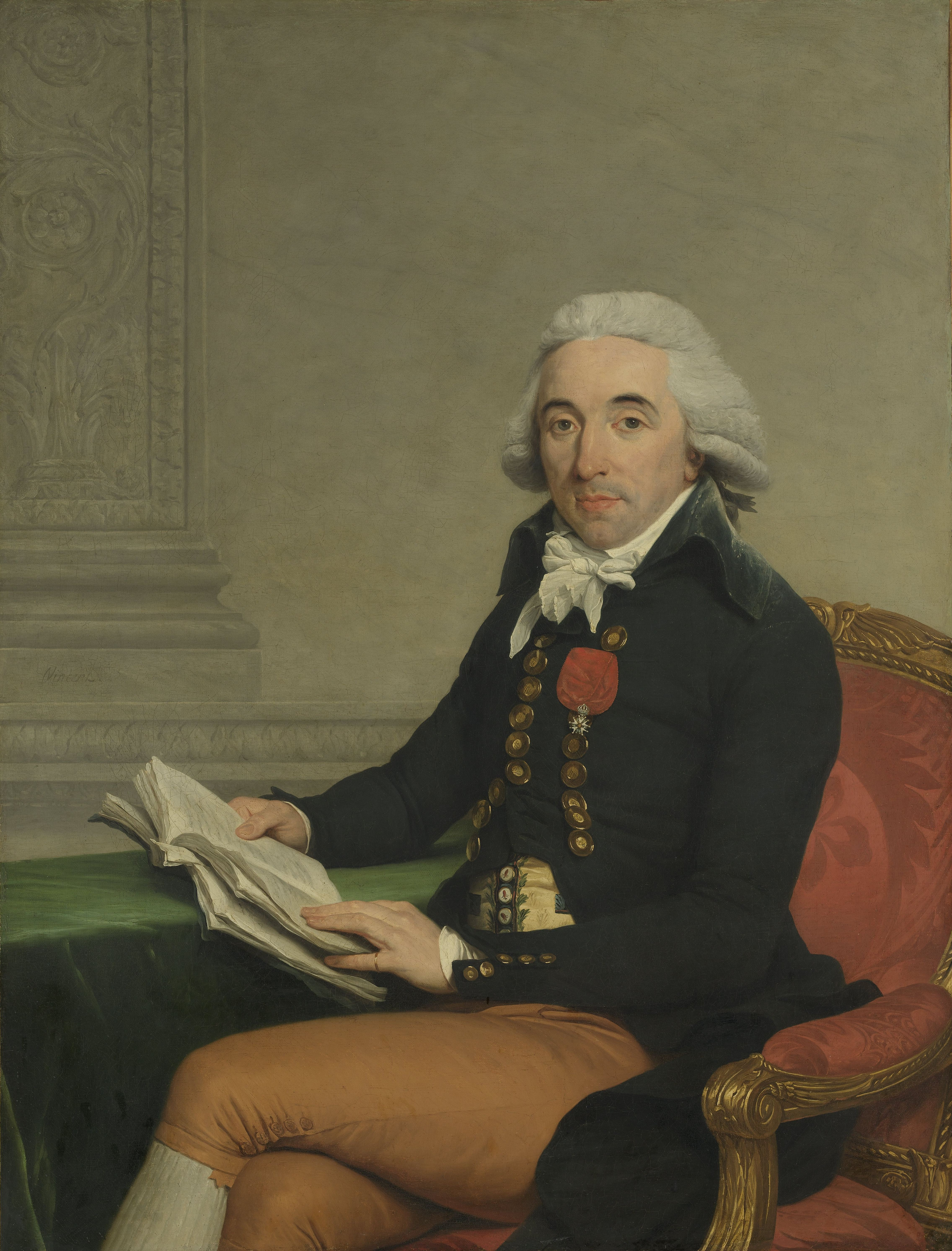
Portrait of a Man, 1795

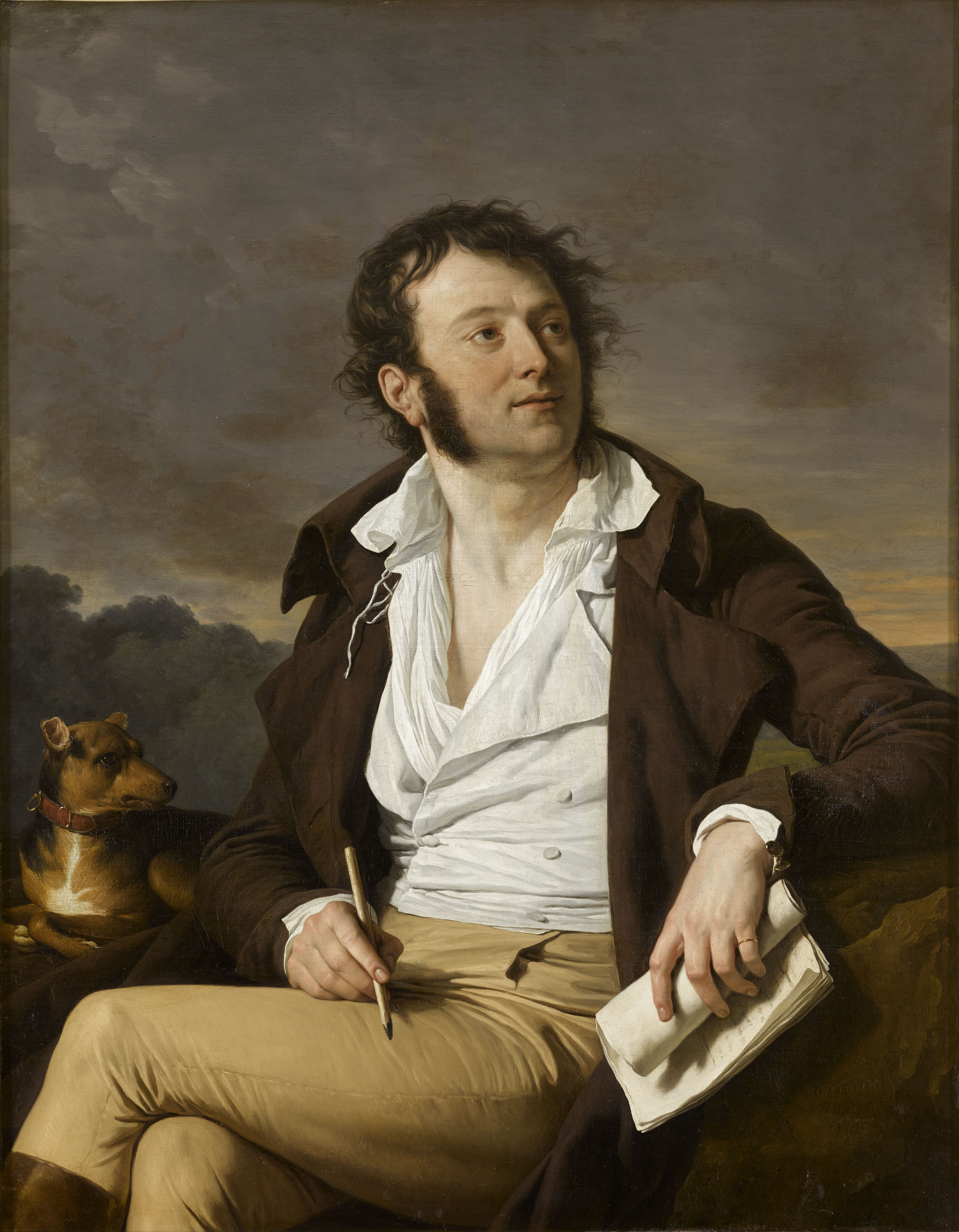
Portrait of Antoine-Vincent Arnault, 1801

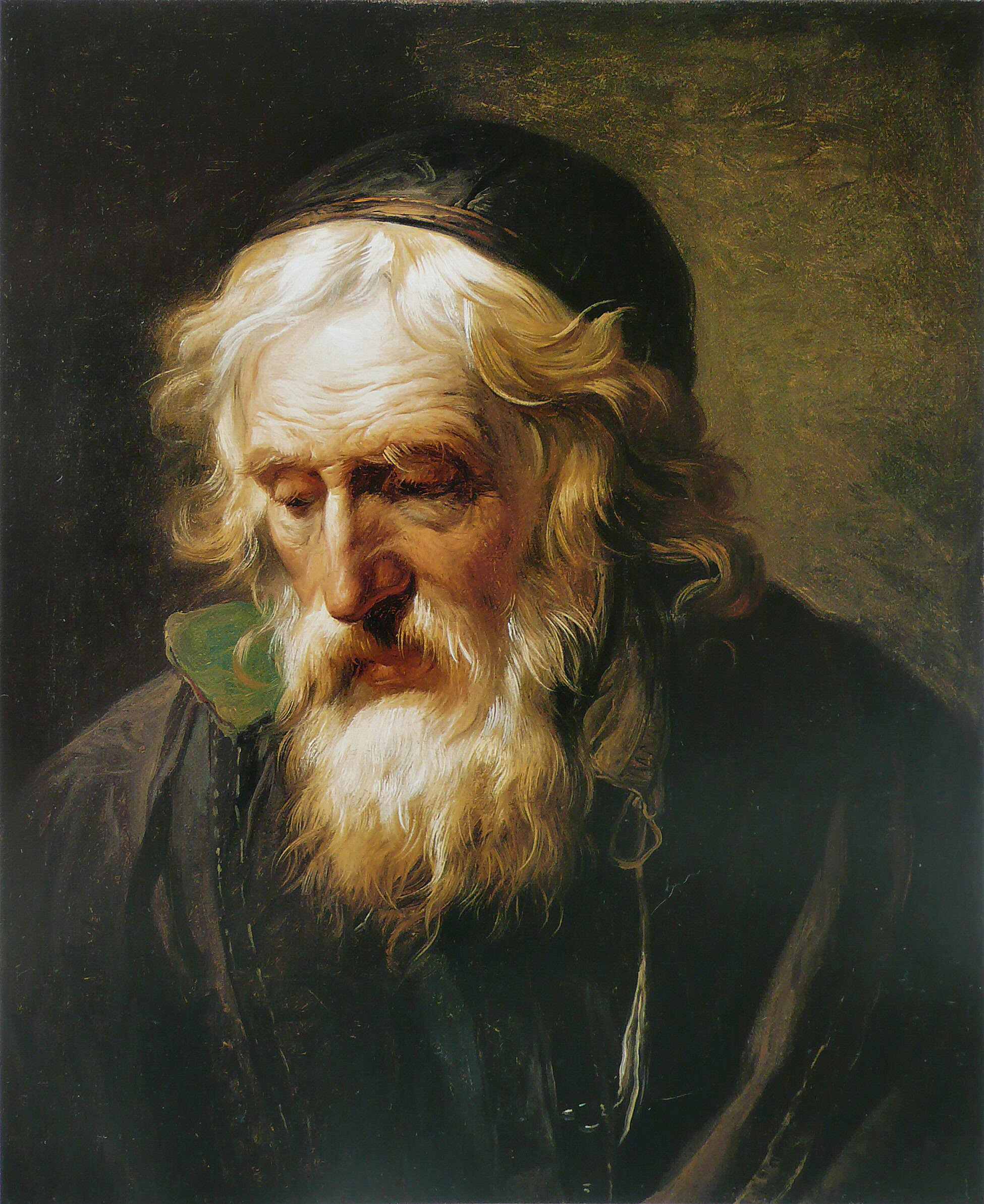
Greek priest

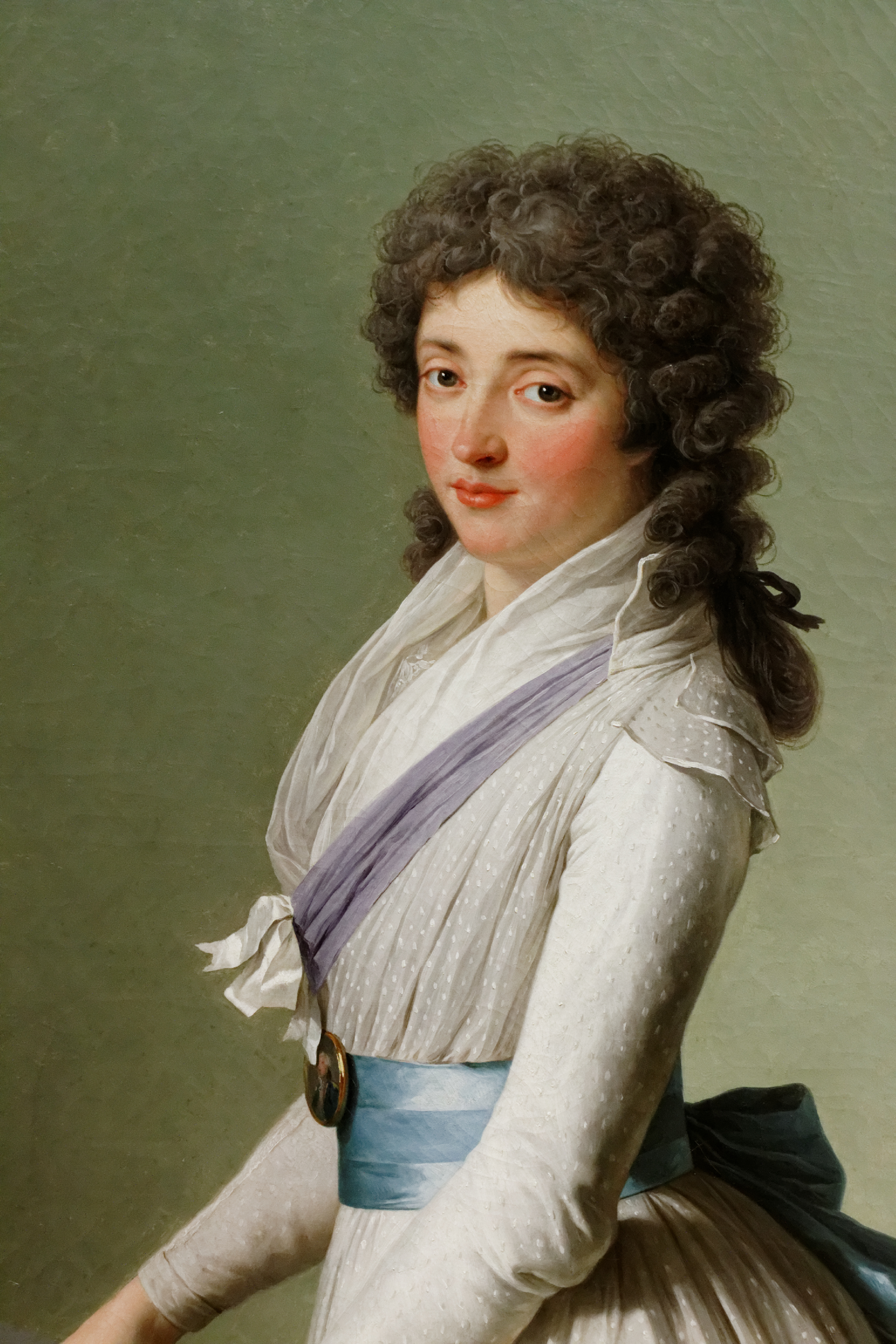
Portrait de la baronne de Chalvet-Souville, née Marie de Broutin (detail)

== See also ==
- Adélaïde Labille-Guiard
- Portrait of Baron Georges Cuvier (1769–1832), Whitfield Fine Art
