= 1745 in Great Britain =

Events from the year 1745 in Great Britain.

== Incumbents ==
- Monarch – George II
- Prime Minister – Henry Pelham (Whig)

== Events ==
- 30 April–11 May – War of the Austrian Succession: British forces defeated at the Battle of Fontenoy.
- 16 June – King George's War: British capture Cape Breton Island in North America from the French.
- 26 June – the earliest known women's cricket match, at Gosden Common in Surrey.
- 9 July (20 July NS) – Jacobite rising: The Du Teillay, carrying the Young Pretender Charles Edward Stuart from France to Scotland, and her escort L'Elisabeth engage with HMS Lion in the English Channel.
- 23 July – Jacobite rising: Charles Stuart lands on Eriskay in the Hebrides in Scotland.
- 15–26 August – War of the Austrian Succession: By the Convention of Hanover, King George II makes peace overtures to Prussia and ends support for Austria.
- 16 August – Jacobite rising: A Jacobite victory at Highbridge Skirmish.
- 19 August – Jacobite rising: Charles Stuart raises his standard at Glenfinnan.
- 11 September – Jacobite rising: Jacobites enter Edinburgh.
- 16 September – Jacobite rising: "Canter of Coltbrigg": The 13th and 14th Dragoons flee Jacobites near Edinburgh.
- 17 September – Jacobite rising: in Edinburgh, Charles Stuart proclaims his father James Francis Edward Stuart as James VIII of Scotland.
- 21 September – Jacobite rising: Government forces are defeated at the Battle of Prestonpans.
- 28 September – the song later to become the British national anthem "God Save the King" is first performed at the Drury Lane Theatre in London in a setting by Thomas Arne.
- 13–15 November – Jacobite rising: Jacobites besiege and capture Carlisle.
- December – Jacobite rising: Jacobite garrison in Carlisle surrenders to Hanoverian forces under Prince William, Duke of Cumberland.
- 4 December – Jacobite rising: Jacobite forces reach Derby causing panic in London.
- 6 December – Jacobite rising: Jacobite forces decide to retreat to Scotland.
- 18 December – Jacobite rising: A Jacobite victory at the Clifton Moor Skirmish, the last action between two military forces on English soil.
- 23 December – Jacobite rising: A Jacobite victory at the Battle of Inverurie.

=== Undated ===
- West towers of Westminster Abbey completed.
- The term "middle class" is first used.

== Publications ==
- Henry Fielding edits the pro-government publication The True Patriot.

== Births ==
- 23 January – William Jessop, civil engineer (died 1814)
- February – Samuel Hearne, explorer, fur-trader, author and naturalist (died 1792)
- 2 February
  - Hannah More, religious writer, Romantic poet and philanthropist (died 1833)
  - John Nichols, printer and antiquary (died 1826)
- 14 February – Lady Sarah Lennox, courtier (died 1826)
- 20 February – Henry James Pye, poet laureate (died 1813)
- 4 March – Charles Dibdin, composer (died 1814)
- 12 May – William Creech, Scottish bookseller and Lord Provost of Edinburgh (died 1815)
- 13 July – Robert Calder, admiral (died 1818)
- 20 July – Henry Holland, architect (died 1806)
- 20 or 21 August – Francis Asbury, bishop of the Methodist Episcopal Church (died 1816 in the United States)
- 17 October – William Scott, 1st Baron Stowell, judge and jurist (died 1836)
- 7 November – Prince Henry, Duke of Cumberland and Strathearn, member of the royal family (died 1793)
- 10 December – Thomas Holcroft, writer (died 1809)

== Deaths ==
- 26 February – Henry Scudamore, 3rd Duke of Beaufort (born 1707)
- 18 March – Robert Walpole, first Prime Minister of Great Britain (born 1676)
- 28 May – Jonathan Richardson, portrait painter, writer on art and collector (born 1667)
- 30 September – Sir John Baird, 2nd Baronet, Scottish politician (born 1686)
- 19 October – Jonathan Swift, Irish satirist (born 1667)
- 16 November – James Butler, 2nd Duke of Ormonde, exiled Irish-born statesman and soldier (born 1665)
- John Freame, banker (born 1669)

== See also ==
- 1745 in Wales
