= Portrait of Louis XVI =

Portrait of Louis XVI may refer to:

- Portrait of Louis XVI (Duplessis), a 1776 painting by Joseph Duplessis
- Portrait of Louis XVI (Callet), a 1779 painting by Antoine-François Callet
