= Portrait of the Comte de Vergennes =

Painting by Antoine-François Callet

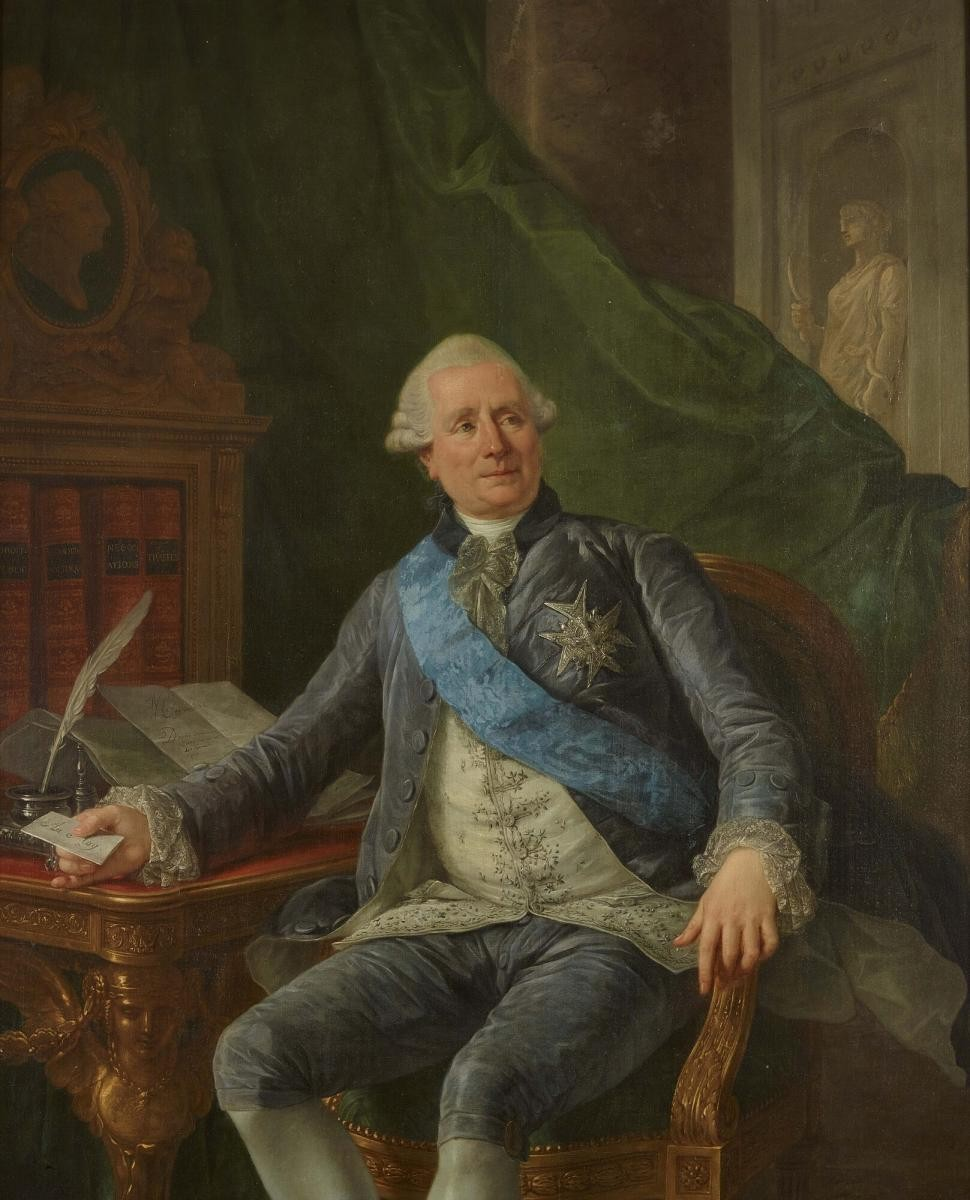
- Artist: Antoine-François Callet
- Year: 1780
- Type: Oil on canvas, portrait painting
- Dimensions: 162 cm × 131 cm (64 in × 52 in)
- Location: Palace of Versailles, Versailles

Portrait of the Comte de Vergennes is an oil on canvas portrait painting by the French artist Antoine-François Callet, from 1780.

== History and description ==
It depicts the Foreign Minister the Comte de Vergennes. Vergennes held the post from 1774 to 1787 and was instrumental in bringing France into the American War of Independence and constructing a large coalition with Spain to defeat the isolated Britain. He is shown seated wearing the bade and blue sash of the Order of the Holy Spirit. Callet was a prominent portraitist of the late Ancien Régime era, noted for in particular for his 1779 Portrait of Louis XVI.

The painting was commissioned to hang at the French Foreign Ministry. It was exhibited at the Salon of 1781 held at the Louvre in Paris. In 2016 it was acquired for the collection of the Museum of French History at the Palace of Versailles. The Italian engraver Vincenzio Vangelisti produced a print based on the painting.

== Bibliography ==
- Fremont-Barnes, Gregory. Encyclopedia of the Age of Political Revolutions and New Ideologies, 1760-1815. Bloomsbury Academic, 2007.
- Klich, Lynda & Zanardi, Tara (ed.) Visual Typologies from the Early Modern to the Contemporary: Local Contexts and Global Practices. Taylor & Francis, 2018.
- Murphy, Orvile T. Charles Gravier: Comete de Vergennes: French Diplomacy in the Age of Revolution. New York Press, 1982.
