= Peircy Brett =

Royal Navy Admiral (1709–1781)

Admiral Sir Peircy Brett
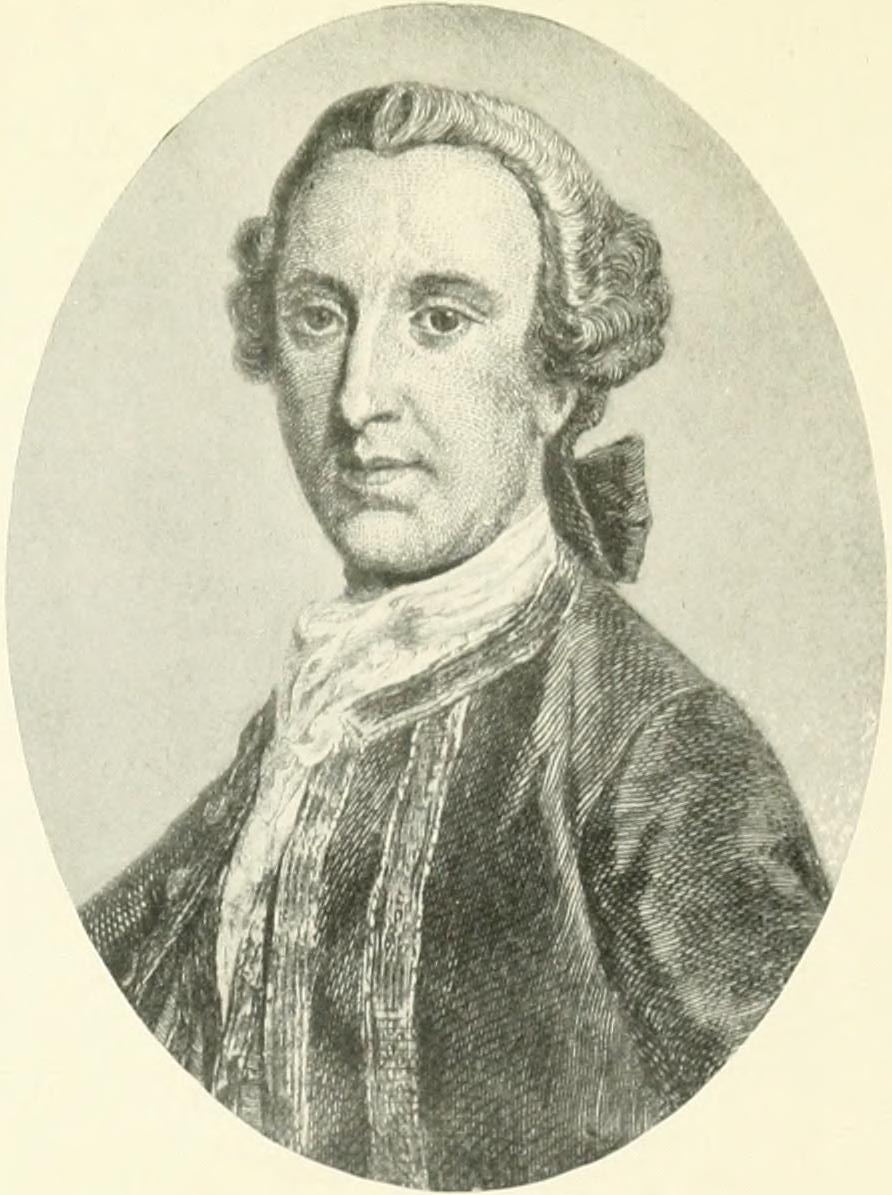
- Sir Peircy Brett
- Born: 1709
- Died: 14 October 1781 (aged 71–72)
- Military career
- Allegiance: Kingdom of Great Britain
- Branch: Royal Navy
- Service years: c.1725–1770
- Rank: Admiral
- Commands: HMS Centurion; HMS Lion; HMS Yarmouth; Royal Caroline; HMS Cambridge; HMS Royal George
- Conflicts: Jacobite rising War of the Austrian Succession; Seven Years' War

Admiral Sir Peircy Brett (1709 – 14 October 1781) was a Royal Navy officer. As a junior officer he served on George Anson's voyage around the world and commanded the landing party which sacked and burned the town of Paita in November 1741. During the Jacobite rising Brett saw action on 9 July 1745, when as captain of the fourth-rate HMS Lion he exchanged fire with the French ships Elizabeth and the Du Teillay: the Du Teillay at the time was carrying Charles Edward Stuart to Scotland with supplies and funds to support his cause. Brett also commanded the third-rate HMS Yarmouth at the First Battle of Cape Finisterre in May 1747 during the War of the Austrian Succession. He commanded HMS Cambridge on the North America and West Indies Station during the Seven Years' War and later became Senior Naval Lord. He was also a Member of Parliament, representing the constituency of Queenborough from 1754 until 1774.

== Naval career ==
=== Early career ===
Born the son of Peircy Brett, a master in the navy, Brett joined the Royal Navy as a volunteer in around 1725. Promoted to lieutenant on 6 December 1734, he was appointed to the fourth-rate HMS Falkland. In July 1738 he transferred to the fifth-rate HMS Adventure and later that year to HMS Gloucester, one of the ships which sailed under then-Commodore George Anson for the Pacific in September 1740.

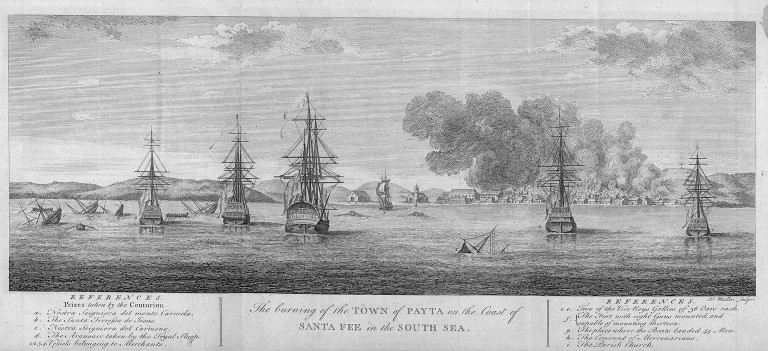
Burning the town of Paita, probably drawn by Brett himself

In February 1741 Brett transferred to Anson's own ship, the fourth-rate HMS Centurion, as second lieutenant, and in this capacity, he commanded the landing party which sacked and burned the town of Paita in November 1741. After the capture of the Spanish treasure ship "Nuestra Señora de Covadonga", Brett became first lieutenant.

On 30 September 1743, Anson named Brett captain of Centurion when Anson himself had to leave the ship for a time in Canton. However the Admiralty refused to confirm the promotion when Brett returned to England in 1744 Instead, Brett was named as post-captain in command of the newly-built 44-gun fifth rate frigate Mary Galley and assigned to patrol duties in the English Channel. His promotion to captain was not confirmed until 29 December 1744 when a new Admiralty Board was convened which included Anson himself as a voting member.

During the Jacobite rising Brett saw action on 9 July 1745, when as captain of the fourth-rate HMS Lion he exchanged fire with the French ships Elizabeth and the Du Teillay. The Du Teillay at the time was carrying Charles Edward Stuart to Scotland with supplies and funds to support his cause. The Lion suffered severe damage and had to give up the pursuit and Charles eventually landed at Eriskay. He transferred to the command of the third-rate HMS Yarmouth in 1747 and commanded her at the First Battle of Cape Finisterre in May 1747 during the War of the Austrian Succession.

In 1748, Anson's official version of his voyage round the World was published. As well as detailing the expedition, it contained a large amount of useful information for future navigators and with forty-two detailed charts and engravings most based on drawings by Brett. In 1752 Brett commanded the Royal Yacht Royal Caroline for a voyage conveying King George II to Germany, for which he was awarded a knighthood. He was appointed captain responsible for all Royal yachts in 1754, and elected as MP for Queensborough in the same year.

A new 80-gun ship of the line, HMS Cambridge, was commissioned in January 1756. Brett was named as her first captain, bringing with him his choice of petty officers and foretopmen from the Royal yacht fleet. Despite her commissioning Cambridge required several months of fitting out for sea service and was still unseaworthy when war with France was declared in May 1756. Brett was forced to wait until December for Cambridge to be declared fit to put to sea, and then it was not until February 1757 that she was equipped with her full complement of cannon.

Brett's orders were to join Admiral Edward Boscawen's Western Squadron protecting British interests on the North America and West Indies Station. Having finally put to sea he found that his ship was slow and top-heavy, with a tendency to heel over in strong winds. He was also forced to deal with widespread sickness among his crew. Disease spread so fast among the crew that Cambridge was forced to return to Plymouth after only one year at sea so that the sick could be discharged to local hospitals. On 5 November 1758 Brett was granted a new position as flag captain for Admiral Anson aboard the 100-gun HMS Royal George. He resigned this commission ten days later and returned to his previous role as captain of the Royal yachts.

=== Flag officer ===
Brett was promoted to rear admiral in 1762. When peace was declared in 1764 Brett returned to service aboard Anson's old vessel Centurion, and was stationed in the Mediterranean. He was appointed to the Board of Admiralty as Senior Naval Lord in the Chatham ministry under Sir Edward Hawke in December 1766, holding office until 28 February 1770. He was promoted to vice admiral on 18 October 1770 and, having resigned his constituency of Queensborough in 1774, he was promoted to full admiral on 29 January 1778. He lived at the Clock House in Beckenham in Kent; he died on 14 October 1781 and was buried at St George's Church, Beckenham.

== Family ==
Brett married Henrietta Colby; the couple had two sons who died in infancy, and a daughter.

== Sources ==
- Laughton, John Knox (1886). "Brett, Peircy" . In Stephen, Leslie (ed.). Dictionary of National Biography. Vol. 6. London: Smith, Elder & Co.
- J. K. Laughton, Brett, Sir Peircy (1709–1781), rev. Roger Morriss, Oxford Dictionary of National Biography, Oxford University Press, 2004
- Lysons, Daniel (1796). The Environs of London: Counties of Herts, Essex & Kent. T. Cadell.
- Rodger, N.A.M. (1979). The Admiralty. Offices of State. Lavenham: T. Dalton Ltd. ISBN 978-0900963940.
- Sainty, J. C. (1975). Office-holders in Modern Britain: Admiralty Officials 1660-1870. Vol. 4. Athlone Press. ISBN 978-0485171440.
- Biography of Sir Peircy Brett. Chalmers' Biography. 1812. p. 493, vol. 6.
- Winfield, Rif (2007). British Warships of the Age of Sail 1714–1792: Design, Construction, Careers and Fates. Barnsley, United Kingdom: Seaforth. ISBN 9781844157006.

Parliament of Great Britain
Preceded by Richard Evans; Thomas Newnham	Member of Parliament for Queenborough; 1754–1774; With: Sir Charles Frederick	Succeeded by Sir Charles Frederick; Walter Rawlinson
Military offices
Preceded by Augustus Keppel	Senior Naval Lord; 1766–1770	Succeeded by Sir Francis Holburne
