= Armand Marc, comte de Montmorin =

French diplomat (1745–1792)

Chevalier Armand Marc de Montmorin
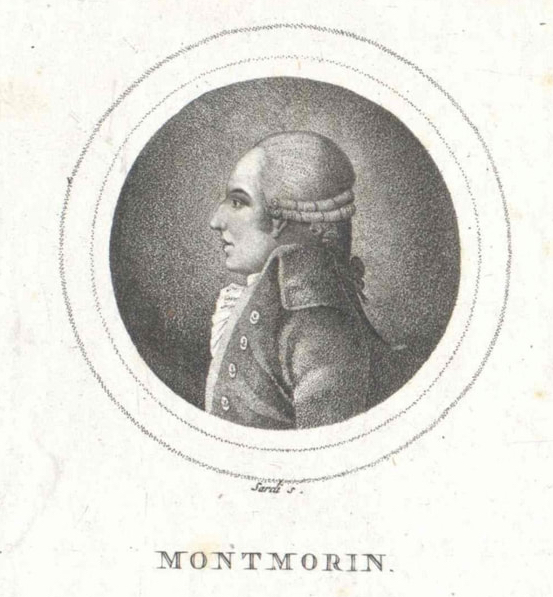

First Minister of State
- In office 3 September 1790 – 3 September 1791
- Monarch: Louis XVI
- Preceded by: Jacques Necker
- Succeeded by: Office abolished

Minister of Foreign Affairs
- In office 16 July 1789 – 29 November 1791
- Monarch: Louis XVI
- Preceded by: Quelen de la Vauguyon
- Succeeded by: Valdec de Lessart
- In office 14 February 1787 – 13 July 1789
- Preceded by: Charles Gravier
- Succeeded by: Quelen de la Vauguyon

Secretary of State for the Navy
- In office 25 August 1787 – 24 December 1787
- Monarch: Louis XVI
- Preceded by: Charles Eugène de La Croix
- Succeeded by: César Henri de La Luzerne

Personal details
- Born: 13 October 1745 Paris, France
- Died: 2 September 1792 (aged 46) Paris, France
- Party: Non-partisan (Moderate)
- Spouse(s): Françoise de Tane (m. 1763–1792); his death
- Children: Calixte; Victoire; Pauline
- Profession: Diplomat, statesman
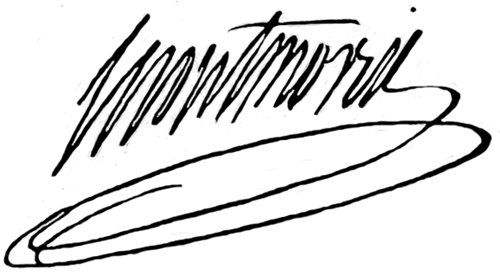
- Signature

Armand Marc, Count of Montmorin de Saint Herem (French: [aʁmɑ̃ maʁk də mɔ̃mɔʁɛ̃]; 13 October 1745 – 2 September 1792) was a French statesman. He was Minister of Foreign Affairs and the Navy under Louis XVI.

== Biography ==
He belonged to a junior branch of a noble family of Auvergne. He was gentleman-in-waiting to Louis XVI when dauphin, and was subsequently appointed ambassador to Madrid. From Madrid he was suddenly summoned to the governorship of Brittany, and in 1787 was appointed by the king to succeed Vergennes in the ministry of foreign affairs. Montmorin was a devoted admirer of Jacques Necker, whose influence at court he helped maintain. He retired when Necker was dismissed on 12 July 1789, but on Necker's recall after the storming of the Bastille again resumed his office, which he continued to hold till October 1791. Honoré Mirabeau had approached him as early as December 1788, with a plan for the policy to be pursued by the court towards the new states general; but Montmorin, offended by Mirabeau's attacks on Necker and by his Histoire secrete de la cour de Berlin, refused to see him.

With the progress of the French Revolution, however, this attitude changed. The comte de la Marck was trying to bring Mirabeau into touch with the court, and for this purpose it was important to secure the assistance of Montmorin. The two men were soon on the closest terms. While Montmorin continued as minister in name, Mirabeau became so in fact. Montmorin did not dare to come to a decision without consulting Mirabeau, but neither Mirabeau nor La Marck were under any illusions as to his character. Mirabeau complained bitterly that Montmorin was "slack" (flasque) and a "poltroon" (gavache). La Marck thought that Montmorin's feebleness was occasionally useful in restraining Mirabeau's impetuosity.

The death of Mirabeau in April 1791 was a severe blow to Montmorin, the difficulty of whose position was enormously increased after the flight of the royal family to Varennes, to which he was not privy. He was forced to resign office, but still continued to advise Louis, and was one of the inner circle of the king's friends, called by the revolutionists "the Austrian Committee." In June 1792 his papers were seized at the foreign office, without anything incriminating being discovered; in July he was denounced, and after 10 August was proscribed. He took refuge in the house of a washerwoman, but was discovered, taken before the Legislative Assembly, and imprisoned in the Prison de l'Abbaye, where he perished in the September massacres. His relative, Louis Victor Henri, marquis de Montmorin de Saint Herem, head of the senior branch of the family, also perished in the massacre.

== Sources ==
- Agénor Bardoux, Pauline de Montmorin, comtesse de Beaumont: Etudes sur la fin du XVIIIieme siècle (Paris, 1884), for a defence of Montmorin's policy;
- A. de Bacourt, Correspondance entre Mirabeau et le comte de La Marck, 1789–1791 (3 vols., Paris, 1851), contains many letters of Montmorin; "Correspondence of the Comte de Moustier with the Comte de Montmorin," in the Amer. Hist. Rev., vol. viii. (1902–1903).
