= HMS Feversham =

Frigate of the Royal Navy

History

England
- Name: HMS Feversham
- Ordered: 9 August 1695
- Builder: Thomas Ellis, Shoreham-by-Sea, West Sussex
- Launched: 1 October 1696
- Commissioned: 1697
- Fate: Wrecked off Cape Breton, 7 October 1711

General characteristics as built
- Class & type: 32-gun fifth rate
- Tons burthen: 3721/94 tons (bm)
- Length: 107 ft 0 in (32.61 m) gundeck; 88 ft 5.5 in (26.96 m) keel for tonnage
- Beam: 28 ft 1.5 in (8.57 m)
- Depth of hold: 10 ft 8 in (3.25 m)
- Propulsion: Sails
- Sail plan: Full-rigged ship
- Complement: 145/110
- Armament: as built 32 guns; 4/4 × demi-culverins (LD); 22/20 × 6-pdr guns (UD); 6/4 × 4-pdr guns (QD)

HMS Feversham was a 32-gun fifth rate built at Shoreham in 1695/97. Her primary assignment was trade protection and counter piracy patrols in Home Waters and North America. She was detached from her assignment to Virginia to assist in the attack on Quebec. She was wrecked while on passage to join the expedition with three transports on 7 October 1711.

She was the first vessel to bear the name Feversham or Faversham in the English and Royal Navy.

== Construction and specifications ==
She was ordered on 9 August 1695 to be built under contract by Thomas Ellis and William Collins of Shoreham. She was launched on 20 April 1695. Her dimensions were a gundeck of 107 feet 0 inches (32.61 metres) with a keel of 88 feet 5.5 inches (26.96 metres) for tonnage calculation with a breadth of 28 feet 1.5 inches (8.57 metres) and a depth of hold of 10 feet 8 inches (3.25 metres). Her builder's measure tonnage was calculated as 3721/94 tons (burthen).

The gun armament initially was four demi-culverins (Note: A demi-culverin was a gun of 3,400 pounds with a four-inch bore firing a 9.5-pound shot with an eight-pound powder charge) on the lower deck (LD) with two guns per side. The upper deck (UD) battery would consist of between twenty and twenty-two 6-pounder guns (Note: A 6-pounder was a Dutch gun used to replace the saker) with ten or eleven guns per side. The gun battery would be completed by four 4-pounder guns (Note: A minion renamed the 4-pounder was a gun of 1,000 pounds with a 3.5-inch bore firing a 4-pound shot with a 4-pound powder charge.) on the quarterdeck (QD) with two to three guns per side.

== Commissioned service 1697-1711 ==
She was commissioned in 1697 under the command of Captain Robert Thompson for service in Irish Waters. Captain Benjamin Hoskins was assigned as her commander for guard ship duties at Plymouth in 1699. Captain Philip Cavendish assumed command on 17 January 1701 to sail to Newfoundland. She was back in Irish Waters in 1702. On 12 January 1703 Captain Sir Charles Rich took command until his death on 17 October 1706. Under his command she plied the Irish Waters and the North Sea on trade protection and anti-piracy patrols. Captain Galfridus Walpole took command after the death of Captain Rich on 17 October. 1707 she was under Captain Walter Riddle followed in 1708 by Captain John Williams patrolling in the North Sea. Captain Charles Vanburgh took command on 21 February 1709 and was followed by Captain Robert Paston on 3 June 1709 then sailed to Virginia. In 1711 the British decided to attack the French colony of Quebec. She was detached from Virginia for the operation under the command of Rear-Admiral Sir Hovenden Walker. She was to join the operation at Gaspe, however, her sailing with three transports was delayed at Virginia.

== Loss ==
She was wrecked along with three transports off Louisbourg, Cape Breton Island, on 7 October 1711 while sailing to join the attack the French colony of Quebec. 90 members of her crew were drowned, including Captain Paston, though 45 members of her crew survived.

== Wreck site ==
The wreck is at Scatarie Island, 20 miles from Louisbourg. The British made several unsuccessful attempts to salvage the ship immediately after her sinking. The wreck was finally located and identified in 1984. Treasure hunters recovered significant numbers of coins and silverware, with the coins providing a rare and important example of what archaeologists call a merchant's hoard, a selection of everyday coins used to buy supplies.On February 7, 1989, Christie's held an auction of the treasure. An exhibit about the wreck is on display at the Maritime Museum of the Atlantic in Halifax, Nova Scotia.
