= Portrait of Louis XVI (Duplessis) =

Painting by Joseph Duplessis

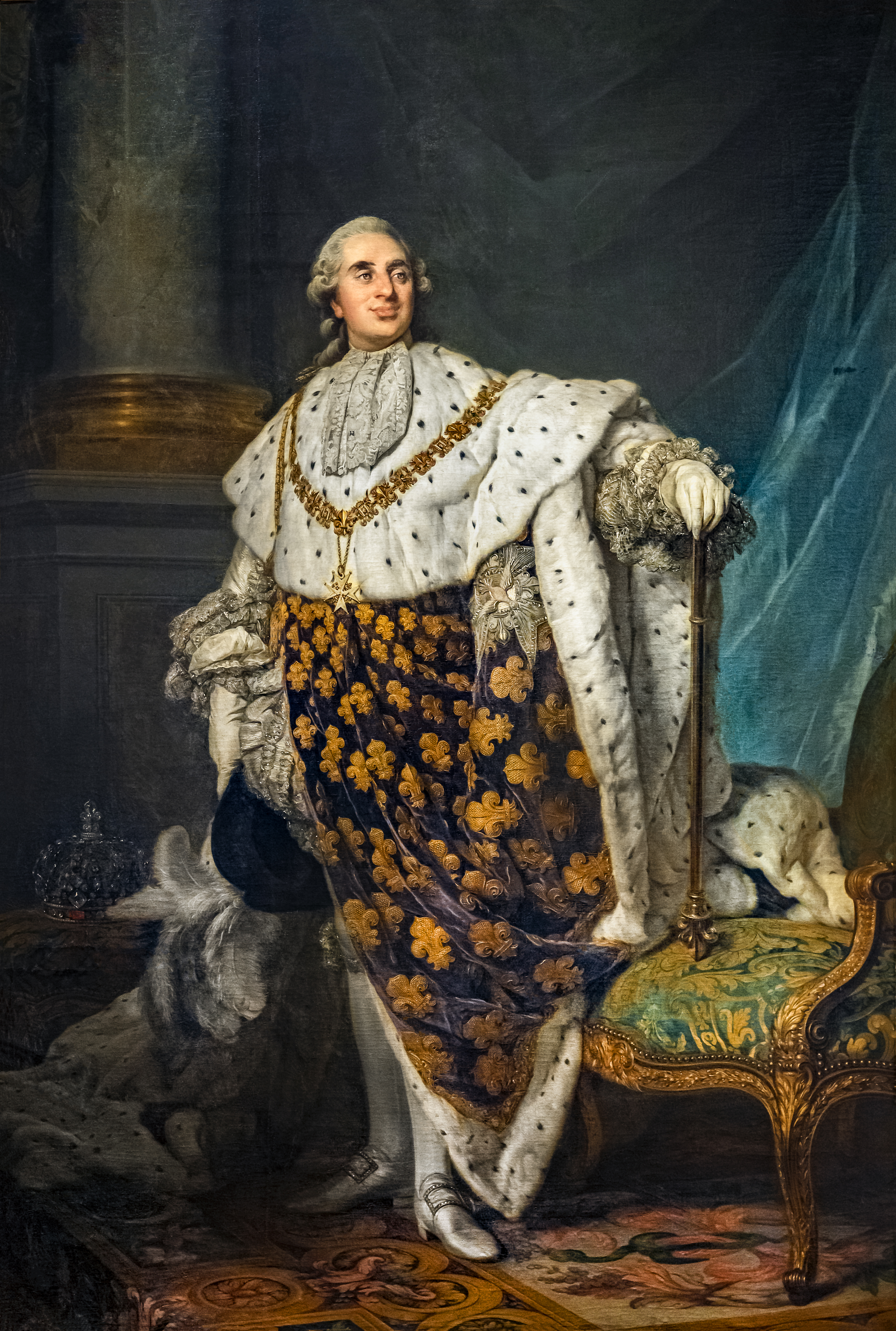
- Version in the Musée Ingres Bourdelle
- Artist: Joseph Duplessis
- Year: 1776
- Type: Oil on canvas, portrait painting
- Dimensions: 227 cm × 175 cm (89 in × 69 in)
- Location: Musée Ingres Bourdelle, Montauban

Portrait of Louis XVI is an oil on canvas portrait painting by the French artist Joseph Duplessis, from 1776.

== History and description ==
It depicts Louis XVI who had succeeded to the throne in 1774 and was eventually to be guillotined in 1793 during the French Revolution. He is portrayed wearing the ermine-lined robes he had worn during the Coronation of Louis XVI which had taken place in Reims.

The original painting was produced in 1776 and exhibited at the Salon of 1777, in Paris. A number of other versions exist, as it was a popular image of the monarch. The original is now considered lost, but of the reproductions produced by Duplessis and others the version at the Musée Ingres Bourdelle, in Montauban is considered the most important.

Versions are also held at the Musée Carnavalet and the Museum of French History at the Palace of Versailles.

== See also ==
- Portrait of Louis XVI, a 1779 portrait by Antoine-François Callet

== Bibliography ==
- Dwyer, Philip. Citizen Emperor: Napoleon in Power. Yale University Press, 2013.
