= Galfridus Walpole =

Royal Navy officer, politician; postmaster general of the Kingdom of Great Britain

Captain Galfridus Walpole
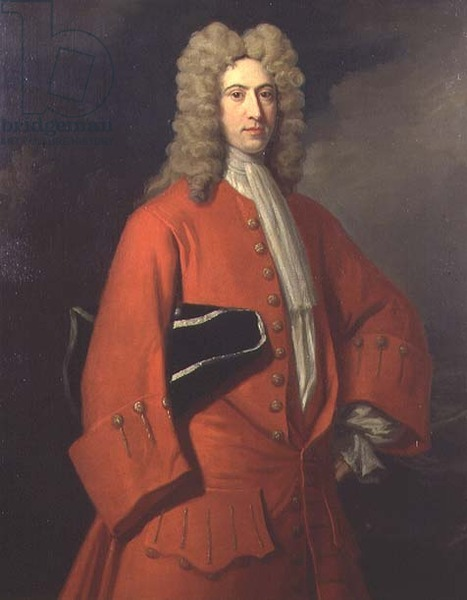
- Charles Jervas portrait of Galfridus Walpole whose right arm was lost at Vado Bay in 1711
- Born: 1683
- Died: 7 August 1726 (aged 42–43)
- Burial place: St Martin Churchyard; Houghton, Norfolk, England
- Spouse: Cornelia Hays
- Relatives: Robert Walpole, father; Sir Robert Walpole, brother; Horace Walpole, nephew (son of Sir Robert)
- Military career
- Allegiance: Kingdom of Great Britain
- Branch: Royal Navy
- Other work: Postmaster General of the United Kingdom; Treasurer of Greenwich Hospital, London

Galfridus Walpole (1683 – 7 August 1726) was a Royal Navy officer, politician and postmaster general of the Kingdom of Great Britain. He lost his right arm after a naval battle against the French in Vado Bay, Italy, in 1711 and commanded ships for another nine years. He sat in the House of Commons from 1715 to 1721, when he took office as joint postmaster general.

== Early life ==
Walpole was born in 1683, the son of Robert Walpole and Mary Burwell of Houghton, Norfolk, and was the younger brother of the politician Sir Robert Walpole. In 1709 he married Cornelia Hays, but they had no children.

== Naval career ==
In 1706 Walpole was commander of HMS Solebay, a sixth-rate 24-gun frigate, followed by HMS Feversham and between 1707–1709 he commanded HMS Poole, a fifth-rate frigate. From 1710–1714 he was in charge of HMS Lion, a 60-gun fourth-rate ship of the line. His last commission was on HMS Peregrine Galley from 1716–1720, a ship that later became a royal yacht.

While commanding Lion, on 22 March 1711,^{a} Walpole's ship was in Vado Bay on the Italian coast in the Mediterranean as a lookout cruiser when it sighted four French ships. Amongst those who gave chase and engaged the enemy for about two hours was Lion, with the loss of forty men. Walpole was so badly injured that his right arm was amputated by the ship's surgeon, John Atkins. He sat up for two nights with Walpole, who gave the surgeon no thanks for the attention.

== Political career ==
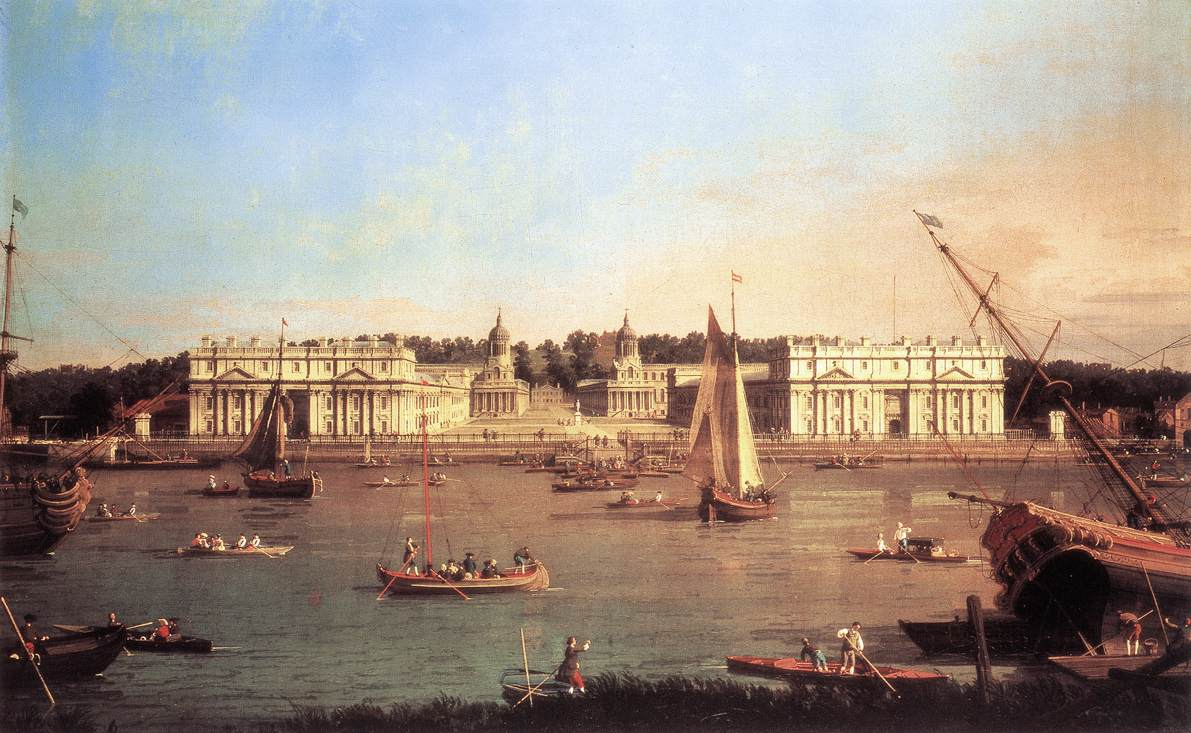
Greenwich Hospital by Canaletto in 1752

Walpole was returned unopposed as Member of Parliament for Lostwithiel, Cornwall, at the 1715 general election. Also in 1715, he was appointed to a sinecure post as Treasurer of Greenwich Hospital, London. He was appointed joint postmaster general, on 8 April 1721 when he was required to vacate his seat in parliament, and also stood down as Treasurer of Greenwich Hospital. He remained in post as Postmaster General for the rest of his life. In 1725, he took out a lease on Westcombe Park, a country estate owned by Sir Gregory Page, 2nd Baronet.

== Death ==
Walpole died without issue on 7 August 1726. He is buried at the Church of St Martin on his brother’s Houghton Hall estate.

== Lord Nelson's sword ==
According to legend, Walpole's sword, used on HMS Lion, was given to a young Horatio Nelson, who is reported to have been carrying it when he too lost his right arm, in the Battle of Santa Cruz on 15 July 1797. The Walpole sword, which has a silver-hilted hanger, was made by Nixon Cutlers of London, has London silver hallmarks for 1752, and a 60 cm curved blade. Due to its provenance, the sword is known as the Galfridus Walpole — Suckling Sword, having been given to Walpole's godson and great nephew Maurice Suckling whose sister Catherine Suckling was Nelson's mother. William Suckling, Maurice's brother, gave the sword to Nelson, who wore his uncle's valued gift in his early career. The sword appears to have been returned to the Suckling family.

The sword was sold at auction by Sotheby's in late 2003 for £36,000, described as "believed to be that carried by Captain (later Admiral Lord) Horatio Nelson" and with extensive notes relating to the provenance and origins of the story that it was with Nelson at the time of his death. Some, however, have doubted the truth of the legend, and W. J. Andrew in Notes and Queries in 1922 argued that Nelson would be most unlikely to have used a hundred-year-old sword in battle.

== See also ==
- John Atkins (naval surgeon)

== Footnotes ==
a.Clewes uses the date as 22 March 1711 but other published accounts, such as Sotheby's and Lady Nevill, state 26 March as the date of the battle.

Parliament of Great Britain
Preceded by Sir Thomas Clarges; Erasmus Lewis	Member of Parliament for Lostwithiel; 1715–1721; With: Thomas Liddell 1715–1718; Edward Eliot 1718–1720; John Newsham 1720–1721	Succeeded by Marquess of Hartington; John Newsham
Political offices
Preceded by James Craggs the Elder; Charles Cornwallis	Postmaster General of the United Kingdom; 1721–1726; With: Edward Carteret	Succeeded by Edward Harrison; Edward Carteret
