= John Atkins (naval surgeon) =

English naval surgeon and writer

John Atkins (1685–1757) was an English naval surgeon and writer.

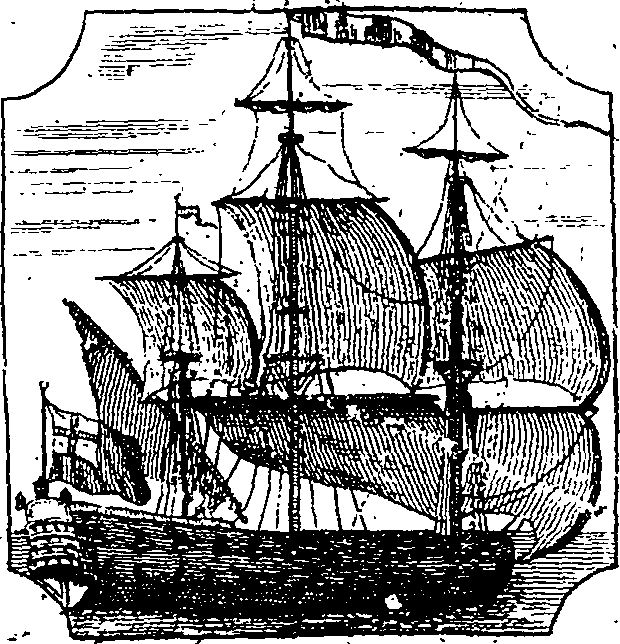
Etching taken from A voyage to Guinea, Brasil, and the West-Indies; in His Majesty's Ships, the Swallow and Weymouth by John Atkins, pub. 1735

== Biography ==
Atkins received his professional education as a surgeon's apprentice, and immediately entered the navy. He records wounds which he treated in Sir George Rooke's victory off Málaga in 1704. In 1707 he was in some small actions with the French in the Channel, and in 1711, he served in the man-of-war HMS Lion at the battle of Vigo Bay. The ship was commanded by Captain Galfridus Walpole, whose right arm was severely wounded. Atkins cut it off above the elbow and sat up two whole nights with the patient afterwards, ‘supposing a tenderness and respect would engage his good opinion and consequently his interest.’ This interested attention did not gain its object, for Captain Galfridus gave no thanks for it, being, as Atkins bitterly observes, ‘the reverse of his brother (Sir Robert), loving cheapness in all jobs’ (Navy Surgeon, 137).

In February 1721, Atkins sailed from Spithead for the coast of Guinea with the Swallow and the Weymouth, sent to put down piracy on the west coast of Africa. They visited Sierra Leone, Wydah, the Gaboon, Elmina, and captured at Cape Lopez 270 pirates and 10,000l. in gold dust. When the pirates were tried, Atkins was made registrary, and complains that for twenty-six hard days' work he only received as many pounds.

Three or four of the crew died every day for six weeks, and the surgeon became purser for lack of another survivor fit for the office. They sailed to Brazil and the West Indies, where at Port Royal a hurricane carried off the masts. In April 1723 the vessels returned to England and were paid off. Atkins was unsuccessful in getting another ship, and took to writing books.

=== Publishing ===
Atkins published two books, both of which have had more than one edition. The ‘Navy Surgeon’ was published first (1732). It is a general treatise on surgery, with remarks on mineral springs, empirics, amulets, and infirmaries. It shows the author to have been an observant but somewhat prejudiced practitioner. The cases are clearly related, and are the best part of the book. Many surgical books are quoted, and enough of other books to show that Atkins was widely read. Horace, Juvenal, Pope, and Milton were known to him, and he admired also Stephen Duck. This book appeared in a shorter form as ‘A Treatise on the following Chirurgical Subjects,’ &c., without date.

Atkins was one of the earliest scientists to be a proponent of the polygenist theory of human origins. In his book A Voyage to Guinea (1723) he said "I am persuaded that the black and white race have sprung from different coloured parents."

In 1735 he published A Voyage to Guinea, Brazil, and the West Indies. This describes the voyage of the Swallow and the Weymouth, the slave trade and the natural history of the Gold Coast. He describes the manatee accurately, and tells much about fetish worship. He shows that there was no evidence of a general cannibalism in any tribe, but mentions how the captain of a slave ship made an enslaved African eat the liver of another as a punishment. An edition of the ‘Navy Surgeon’ in 1742 contains several additions.

== See also ==
- List of abolitionist forerunners
