= Congress of Hanover =

The Congress of Hanover took place in the Electorate of Hanover in 1752. It was convened by the British government who wished to agree a schedule for the election of the next Holy Roman Emperor. All of the eight voting German prince-electors were invited to attend, as was a representative of France. The Congress lasted, intermittently, from June until October 1752.

== British support for Archduke Joseph as the new Holy Roman Emperor ==
The British wanted a swift election of their favoured candidate, the Austrian heir apparent Archduke Joseph. The British Secretary of State the Duke of Newcastle had travelled to the continent with George II of Great Britain to oversee the Congress. The French were represented by Charles Gravier, comte de Vergennes a young diplomat.

== French opposition to the British plans, despite their seeming co-operation ==
The British had agreed to pay some of the smaller electors subsidies in order to gain their votes. Saxony received a yearly payment of £48,000. The French perceived this as an attempt to forge a pro-British alliance of the German states to create a military coalition in any future war. They saw the sudden British interest in the election as a smoke screen behind which they were advancing their own interests in Germany. In response France applied pressure on Austria to try to block the scheme while Vergennes attempted to appear co-operative with Newcastle at the Congress.

== Decision in favor of Archduke Joseph ==
The Congress finally concluded with the intention to elect the Austrian candidate.

== Aftermath ==
Newcastle believed that the election of Joseph was sealed, but when he travelled to Vienna, he found the Austrians unwilling to proceed; they were using the requirement to pay a small payment of money to the Electoral Palatinate as justification for their refusal. The Austrians were preparing for a war with Prussia in which they would need France as allies and so they had no wish to risk offending it. They also attempted to appease the British by suggesting alternative candidates.

Even when the British offered themselves to compensate the Elector Palatine, Austria refused to agree. The Austrian rejection of the scheme was the beginning of the end for the longstanding Anglo-Austrian Alliance, which collapsed in 1756. Newcastle and his Austrophile allies in the British cabinet were severely weakened, and Newcastle was also personally disappointed at the failure of a scheme into which he had put so much effort.

Joseph eventually became Holy Roman Emperor in 1765, following the Seven Years' War. The lack of Austrian interest in acquiring the throne demonstrated how dramatically less important the role was in the 18th century.

== Bibliography ==
- Browning, Reed. The Duke of Newcastle. Yale University Press, 1975.
- Murphy, Orville T. Charles Gravier: Comte de Vergennes: French Diplomacy in the Age of Revolution. New York Press, 1982.
