= Charles Gravier, comte de Vergennes =

French statesman and diplomat (1719–1787)

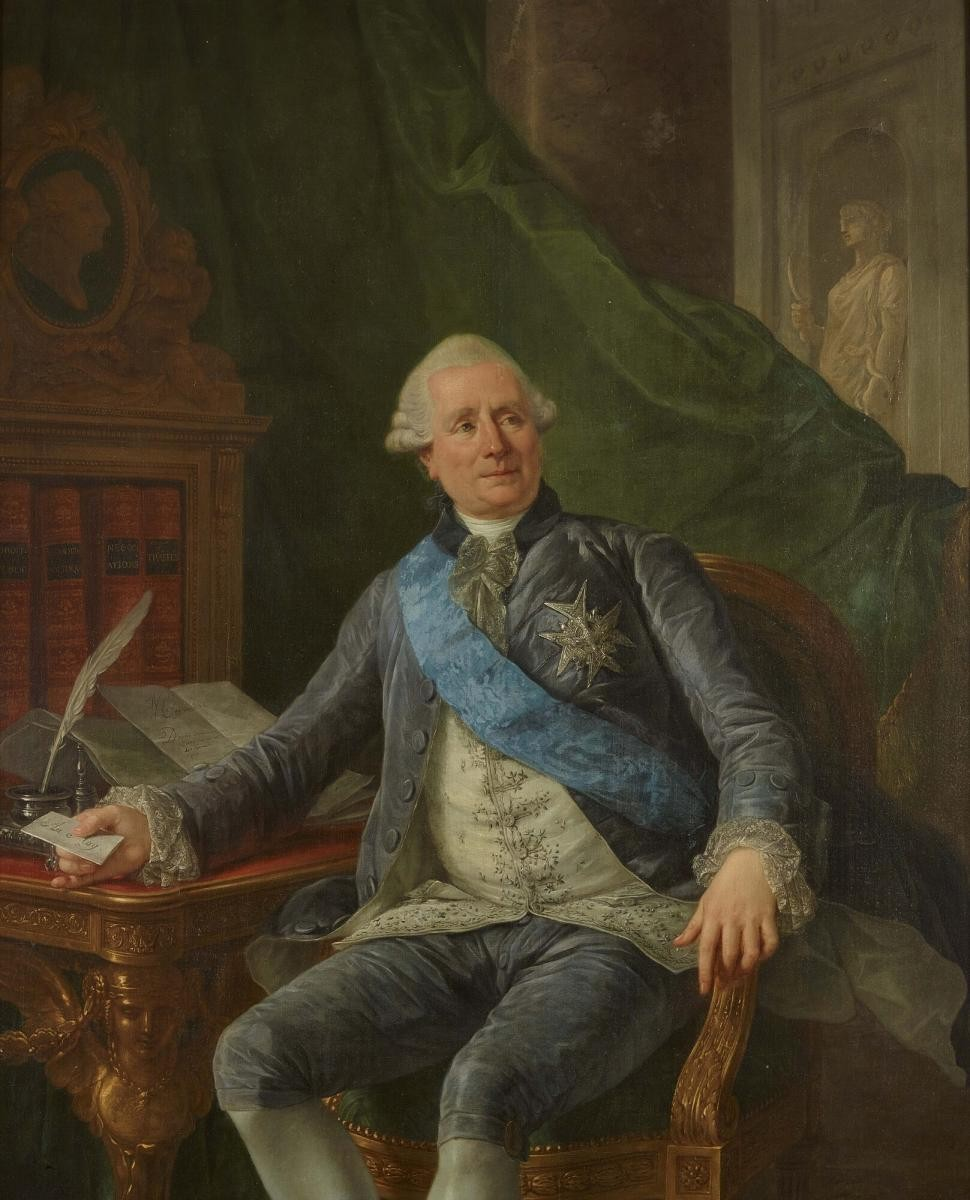
- Portrait of the Comte de Vergennes by Antoine-François Callet, 1780

Chief Minister of the French Monarch
- In office 21 November 1781 – 13 February 1787
- Monarch: Louis XVI
- Preceded by: Count of Maurepas
- Succeeded by: Archbishop de Brienne

Minister of Foreign Affairs
- In office 21 July 1774 – 13 February 1787
- Monarch: Louis XVI
- Preceded by: Henri Bertin
- Succeeded by: Count of Montmorin

Ambassador of France to Sweden
- In office 1771–1774
- Monarch: Louis XV
- Preceded by: François de Modène
- Succeeded by: Pierre d'Usson de Bonnac

Ambassador of France to the Ottoman Empire
- In office 1755–1768
- Monarch: Louis XV
- Preceded by: Pierre Puchot
- Succeeded by: Count of Saint-Priest

Personal details
- Born: 29 December 1719 Dijon, France
- Died: 13 February 1787 (aged 67) Versailles, France
- Spouse: Anne Duvivier (m. 1767)
- Children: Constantin; Louis
- Profession: Diplomat, statesman

Gravier de Vergennes Famille Gravier de Vergennes
- Noble family
- Parti : au I, de gueules à 3 oiseaux essorants d'argent, ceux en chef affrontés; au II, de gueules à la croix d'argent et sur laquelle broche (en cœur), un écusson de sable à un cep de sinople et au chef d'azur chargé d'un soleil d'or.

- Arms of the Count of Vergennes as member of the Order of the Holy Spirit

Charles Gravier, comte de Vergennes (French: [vɛʁʒɛn]; 29 December 1719 – 13 February 1787) was a French statesman and diplomat. He served as Foreign Minister from 1774 to 1787 during the reign of Louis XVI, notably during the American War of Independence.

Vergennes rose through the ranks of the diplomatic service during postings in Portugal and Germany before receiving the important post of Envoy to the Ottoman Empire in 1755. While there he oversaw complex negotiations that resulted from the Diplomatic Revolution before being recalled in 1768. After assisting a pro-French faction to take power in Sweden, he returned home and was promoted to foreign minister.

Vergennes hoped that by giving French aid to the American revolutionaries he would be able to weaken British dominance of the international stage in the wake of Britain's victory over France in the Seven Years' War. Alliance with the revolutionaries produced mixed results for France as, despite helping to secure American independence from Britain, France extracted little material gain from the war and the costs of fighting further damaged the already weakened French royal finances in the years before the French Revolution.

In part as a result of his efforts in crafting the Franco-American alliance, Vergennes became a dominant figure in French politics during the 1780s. He died on the eve of the revolution in his own nation.

== Early life ==
Charles Gravier was born in Dijon, France, on 29 December 1719. His family were members of the country aristocracy. He spent his youth in a townhouse at Dijon and on the family's country estates. He had an elder brother Jean Gravier, marquis de Vergennes, born in 1718, who eventually inherited the family estates. His mother died when he was three, and his father subsequently remarried. Vergennes received his education from Jesuits in Dijon. In 1739, at the age of twenty, he accepted an offer to go to Lisbon as an assistant to Théodore Chevignard de Chavigny, comte de Toulongeon who was mutually referred to as his "uncle", but was in fact a more distant relative. Chavigny was an experienced diplomat and secret agent who had been made ambassador to Portugal.

== Diplomatic service ==
=== Portugal and Bavaria ===
The objective of Chavigny and Vergennes in Lisbon was to keep Portugal from entering the War of the Austrian Succession on the side of Britain, a task that proved relatively easy as the Portuguese had little interest in joining the war. In 1743 Vergennes accompanied his uncle to the court of Charles VII who was the ruler of Bavaria and also held the title of Holy Roman Emperor. Charles VII was a key ally of the French in the ongoing war against Austria, and they were charged with keeping him in the war by assuaging his concerns which they accomplished successfully. They next were instrumental in the agreement of the Union of Frankfurt, a pact involving several German rulers to uphold Charles VII's interests. after Charles VII's sudden death in 1745, they strove to help his successor Maximilian III but were unable to prevent him from losing his capital at Munich and making peace with the Austrians at the Treaty of Füssen. In November 1745 Chavigny was relieved of his post, and returned to France accompanied by Vergennes. The following year they returned to Portugal to take up their previous posts there where they remained until 1749, unsuccessfully trying to negotiate a commercial treaty.

=== Congress of Hanover ===
After their return home, Vergennes and his uncle were now in favour with the French Foreign Minister Puiseulx. When Chavigny met Louis XV at Versailles, he lobbied for Vergennes to be given an appointment. In 1750 Vergennes was appointed as Ambassador to the Electorate of Trier, one of the smaller German electorates. Vergennes faced an immediate challenge, as the British were planning to have an Austrian candidate Archduke Joseph elected as King of the Romans, a position that designated the next Holy Roman Emperor. The Austrians had supplied the Emperors for centuries until 1740, when Charles VII of Bavaria had been elected triggering the War of the Austrian Succession. The title eventually came back under Austrian control, and in 1748 the Treaty of Aix-la-Chapelle was agreed, bringing peace.

The British strategy was directed by the Duke of Newcastle, the Northern Secretary and brother of the Prime Minister. Newcastle hoped the election would prevent a recurrence of the recent war, by guaranteeing continued Austrian dominance in Germany. The French saw the proposal as part of a scheme by the British to boost their own power in Germany. Vergennes appointment was designed to frustrate the British plan, and Trier was considered a good strategic spot for this mission. He worked at getting the ruler of Trier to withhold his vote from Joseph, while mobilising wider resistance.

In 1752 an attempt to settle the matter, Newcastle travelled to Hanover where a special Congress was convened. In April 1752 Vergennes was appointed as envoy to George II of Great Britain in his separate role as Elector of Hanover. His task was to uphold French interests at the Congress, either by delaying the election or preventing it entirely. To enable this, France championed the claims of the French-allied Palatine for payment of money they claimed against Austria and Britain insisting it be settled before the election took place. The British eventually agreed to a settlement, but Austria refused to accept this, creating a rift between the two countries which endangered the Anglo-Austrian Alliance. Newcastle was ultimately forced to dissolve the Congress and abandon the election.

The Congress was regarded as a diplomatic triumph for Vergennes and he received praise from Newcastle for his skills. To counter a last attempt by Austria to get an agreement, Vergennes was sent to the Palatine in January 1753 where he secured confirmation that they would stick to France's strategy. He then returned to Trier where he spent fourteen quiet months before he was given his next posting. His time in Germany shaped his views on diplomacy. He was critical of the British tendency of bowing to public opinion because of their democracy, and he was concerned by the rising power of Russia.

=== Ottoman Empire ===
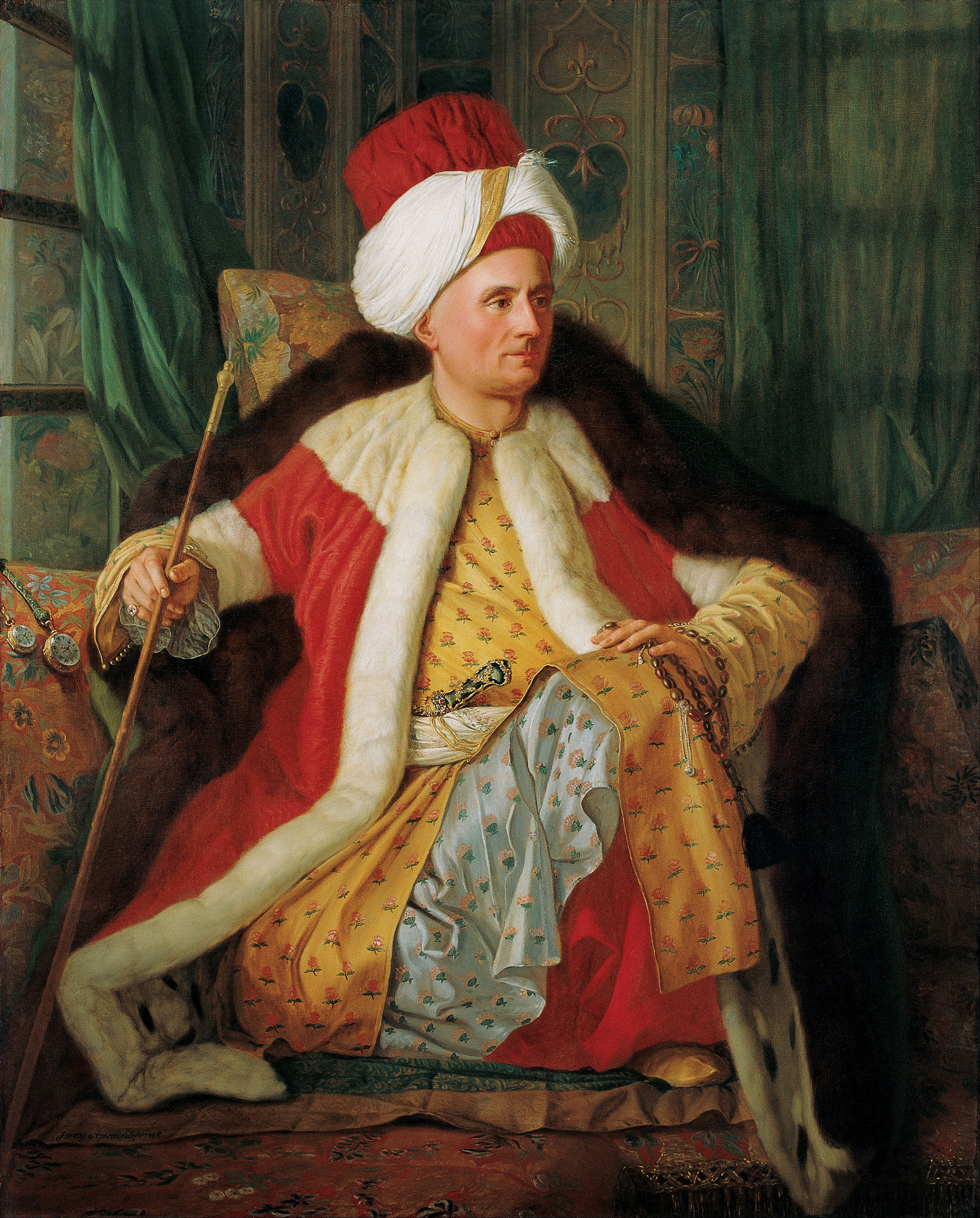
Charles Gravier, comte de Vergennes in Ottoman dress, painted by Antoine de Favray, 1766, Pera Museum, Istanbul

His successful advocacy of French interests in Germany led him to believe his next posting would be as Ambassador to Bavaria. Instead, he was sent to the Ottoman Empire in 1755, first as minister plenipotentiary, then as full ambassador. The reason for Vergennes' original lesser rank was that sending a new ambassador was a time-consuming elaborate ceremony, and there was a sense of urgency because of the death of the previous ambassador. Before he left France, he was inducted into the Secret du Roi.

Vergennes arrived in Constantinople as the Seven Years' War was brewing and Osman III had recently come to the throne. The Ottomans were traditional allies of the French and were a major trading partner, but the weakening of Ottoman power and the growth of Russia threatened the old system. Despite their close ties, the two states had no formal alliance. In his official orders, Vergennes was ordered not to agree any treaty, but he received secret instructions from the king to agree a treaty if it supported the king's schemes in Eastern Europe.

Vergennes's task was to try to persuade the Ottomans to counter the Russian threat to Poland, working in conjunction with Prussia. The Diplomatic Revolution of 1756 turned that scheme upside down as France became friendly to and then allied to Austria and Russia and an enemy of Prussia, which forced Vergennes to reverse his anti-Russian rhetoric. The Ottoman leadership were angered by the new Franco-Austrian Alliance, which they saw as hostile towards them. Vergennes spent the next few years trying to repair relations and persuade the Turks not to attack Austria or Russia, as they were being urged to do by Prussian envoys.

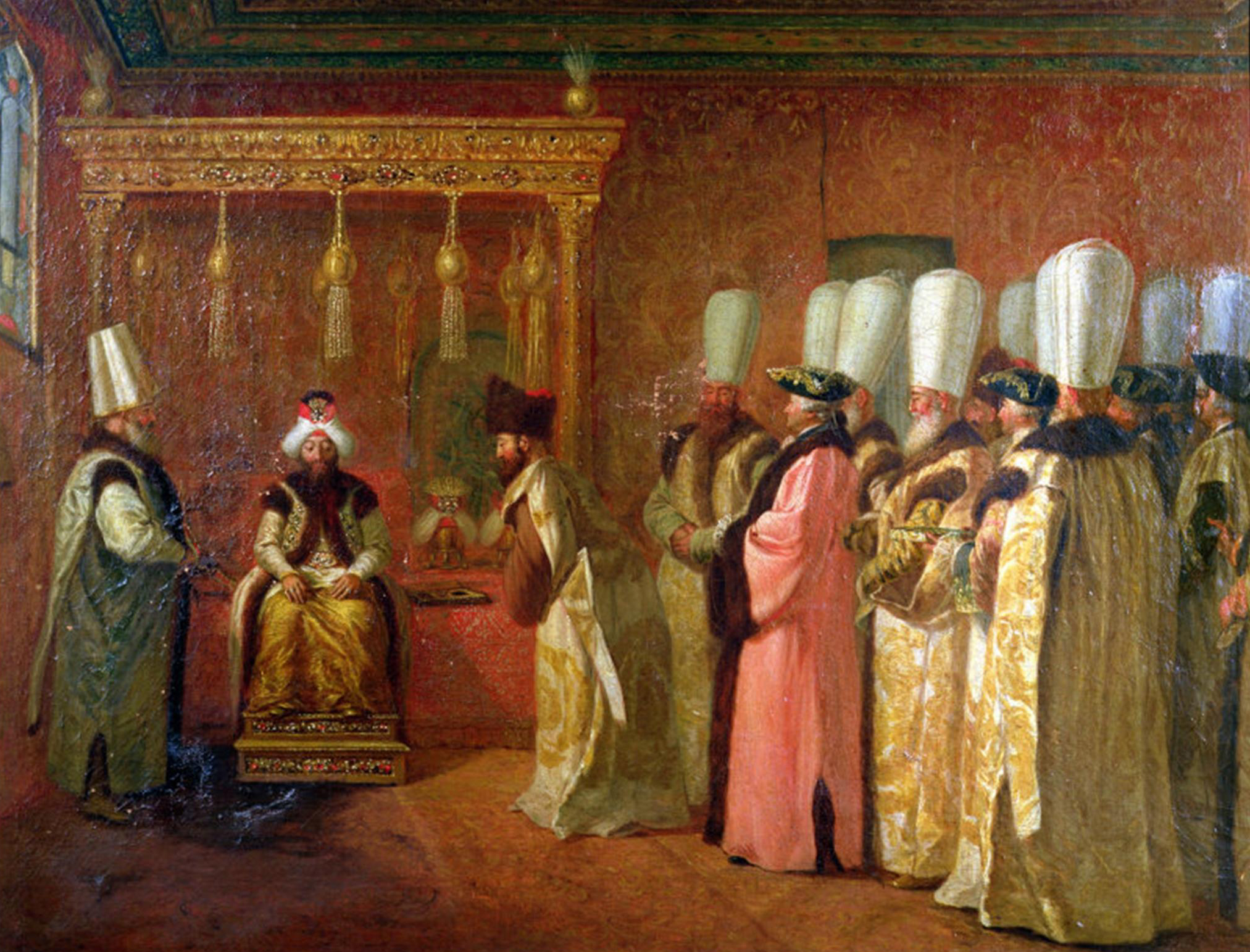
Audience of Charles de Vergennes with Sultan Osman III in 1755, Pera Museum, Istanbul

Towards the end of the Seven Years' War, Vergennes tackled several new problems. A dramatic reversal of Russian policies following the succession of Peter III forced Vergennes to return to his previous policy of encouraging anti-Russian sentiment, only to change again when Peter was overthrown by his wife, Catherine. Vergennes also had to deal with the consequences of the theft of the Sultan's flagship by Christian prisoners, who took it to Malta. The Sultan threatened to build up a large fleet and invade the island, potentially provoking a major war in the Mediterranean in which France would have to defend Malta in spite of the global war that it was already fighting. Eventually, a compromise was agreed in which the French negotiated the return of the ship, but not the prisoners, to the Sultan.

The Treaty of Paris in 1763 brought an end to the war, but France was forced to cede significant territory to the British, easing some of the strains on Vergennes. However, he was left personally disappointed by the decline in French prestige. He was also alarmed by the weakening of French influence in Poland, which, in 1764, elected Stanislas Poniatowski, a Russian-backed candidate, as its king after it became apparent that France was powerless to prevent it. Vergennes's efforts to convince the Ottomans to intervene in the election were undermined by a failure to settle on a single French candidate for the throne, and both France and the Ottomans were eventually forced to acknowledge Stanislas as king. As he was a lover of Catherine the Great, it was believed that Poland would become a satellite of Russia or even that the two states might be merged.

=== Marriage and recall ===
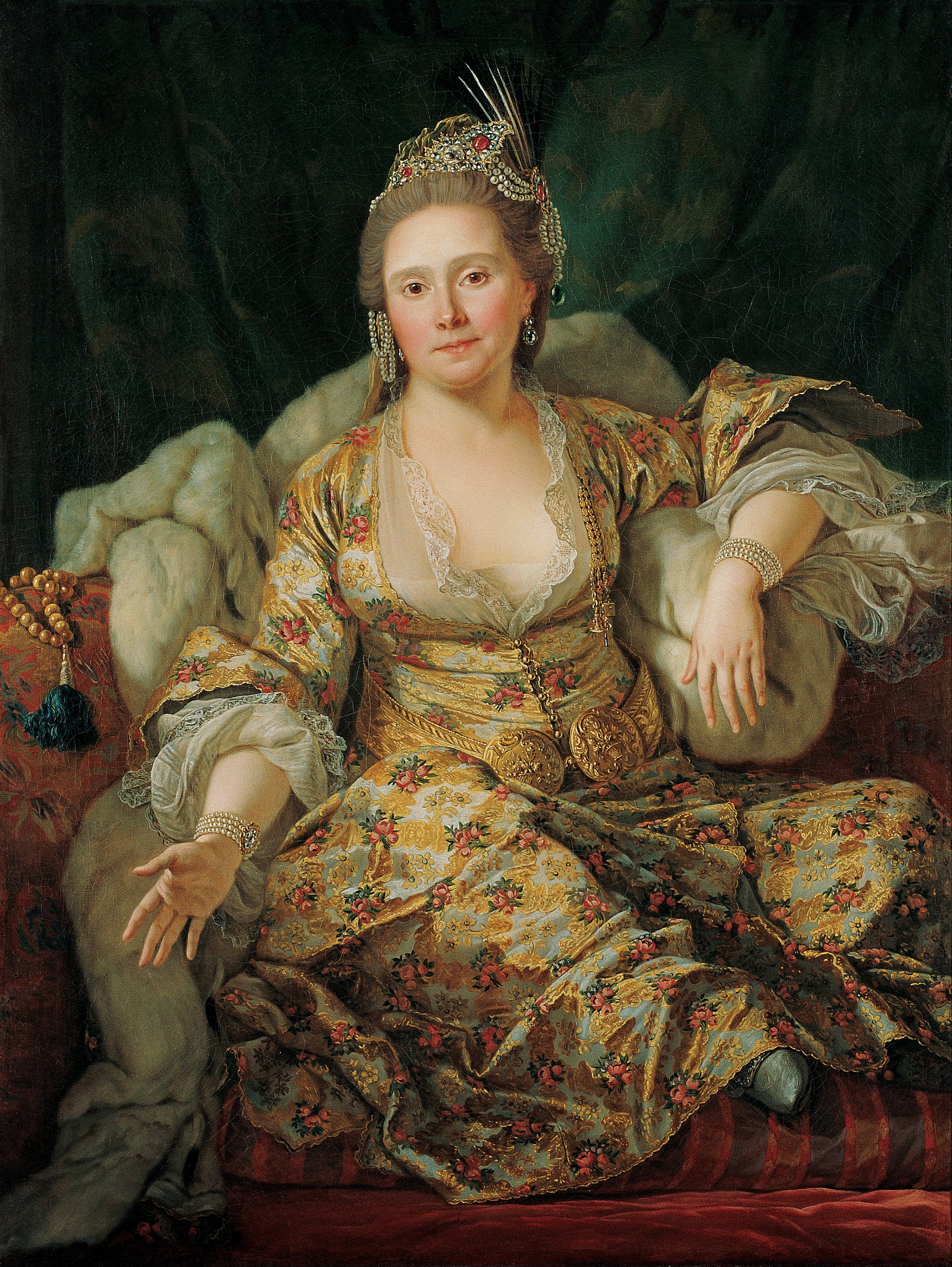
Charles Gravier's wife, Annette Duvivier, comtesse de Vergennes, in oriental costume, by Antoine de Favray

In 1768, he was recalled, ostensibly because he married the widow Anne Duvivier (1730–1798), also known as de Viviers; they previously lived together while she was the ambassador's mistress. In addition, Gravier married her without seeking the King's consent. She was the widow of Francesco Testa (c. 1720–1754), a merchant member of one of the oldest and distinguished Latin families of Péra, originally from Genoa. She was widowed at the age of 24, before she met Charles Gravier, and they had two daughters together. The painter Antoine de Favray who was living in Istanbul at this time painted Charles Gravier's wife, Annette Duvivier, Comtesse de Vergennes, in an oriental costume, sitting on a divan, shortly before they married.

However, Charles Gravier was more probably recalled because the Duc de Choiseul thought him not competent to provoke a war between Imperial Russia and the Ottomans, which Choiseul hoped for. Choiseul wanted to weaken the power of Russia as he believed they were becoming too strong in the Baltic Sea. Choiseul regarded the best way of doing that as provoking a costly war between them and the Ottomans. Although he thought the strategy unwise, Vergennes continuously advocated war in Constantinople by trying to convince the Ottomans that war was the only way to check Russia's rising power.

Vergennes's marriage had taken place without the King's consent, which was a requirement for French ambassadors. In France Vergennes encountered strong disapproval of his marriage and was aware that he returned home in disgrace. In spite of his doubts, Vergennes was successful in persuading the Ottomans to declare war against Russia, and in 1768 the Russo-Turkish War broke out. It eventually ended in a decisive victory for the Russians, who gained new territory, and further eroded Ottoman power. Despite his opposition to the policy, Vergennes still took credit in France for having fulfilled his orders to provoke a war. During this period Vergennes and Choiseul developed a mutual dislike of each other.

=== Sweden ===
After Choiseul's dismissal in 1770, Vergennes was sent to Sweden with instructions to help the pro-French Hats faction with advice and money. The revolution of 1772 by which King Gustav III secured power (19 August 1772) was a major diplomatic triumph for France and brought to an end the Swedish Age of Liberty, which brought back the absolute monarchy in Sweden.

== Foreign minister ==
=== Appointment ===
With the accession of King Louis XVI in 1774, Vergennes became foreign minister. His policy was guided by the conviction that the power of the states on the periphery of Europe, namely Great Britain and Russia, was increasing, and ought to be diminished. When he was appointed to the job, he had spent almost the entirety of the previous thirty five years abroad in diplomatic service. He readily admitted that he had lost touch with developments in France, and was mocked by some political opponents as a "foreigner". Despite this, or perhaps more because of it, he was able to view France's foreign affairs with a more abstract nature, taking in the wider European context.

== American War of Independence ==
Vergennes' rivalry with the British, and his desire to avenge the disasters of the Seven Years' War, led to his support of the Thirteen Colonies in the American War of Independence. As early as 1765, Vergennes predicted that the loss of the French threat in North America would lead to the Americans "striking off their chains". In 1775 the first fighting broke out, and in July 1776, the colonists declared independence. Historians believe that, because of financial strains for France, this commitment contributed to the French Revolution of 1789.

=== Entry into the war ===
Long before France's open entry into the war, Vergennes approved of Pierre Beaumarchais's plan for secret French assistance. From early 1776, the French gave supplies, arms, ammunition and volunteers to the American rebels. The weakness of the British naval blockade off the American coast allowed large amounts of goods to reach the continent. In 1777, Vergennes informed the Americans' commissioners that France acknowledged the United States, and was willing to form an offensive and defensive alliance with the new state. In the wake of the Battle of Saratoga, a defeat for the British, Vergennes feared that the British and colonists might reconcile. He hastened to create an alliance with the Americans from fear that they might jointly attack France with the British.

Although Vergennes had long planned for France to enter the war jointly with Spain, Charles III was more interested in mediating the dispute, as he did not want to encourage colonial revolts. Vergennes pressed ahead with his alliance, in agreement with the American envoy Benjamin Franklin, which would almost certainly lead to war with Britain. In the wake of the Franco-American agreement, the Americans rejected British peace offers made by the Carlisle Peace Commission.

=== Strategy ===
Despite American rebels' optimism related to France's entry into the war, the new forces did not quickly affect the balance of power in North America. A fleet under Admiral d'Estaing sailed to assist the rebels but failed in attacks on British forces in Rhode Island and Savannah, placing significant strains on Franco-American relations. Vergennes continued to send large amounts of money to keep the war effort afloat, but the British regained the initiative with their Southern Strategy.

In 1779, Spain's entry into the war against the British made the Allies' joint fleet considerably larger than the British Royal Navy, but their attempted invasion of Britain that year miscarried. This seriously undermined Vergennes' plans, as he had anticipated a swift and simple war against the British. It promised to be considerably more difficult and expensive than he had hoped.

=== League of Armed Neutrality ===
By a series of negotiations, Vergennes sought to secure the armed neutrality of the Northern European states, which was eventually achieved by Catherine II of Russia. Britain declared war on the Dutch Republic in 1780 after discovering Dutch support for the Americans. Vergennes believed the Dutch were most valuable as neutrals than as allies, as they could supply France through the British blockade. He briefly entertained the hope that Britain's war with the Dutch would lead Russia to declare war on Britain, but Catherine declined to act. The Dutch entry into the war placed further strains on the French treasury, as they searched for finances to support the Dutch war effort.

Vergennes acted as an intermediary in the War of the Bavarian Succession between Austria and Prussia, which he feared could trigger a major European war. He did not want his strategy of sending French and Spanish forces against Britain in the Americas to be deflected by troops and resources being diverted to Central Europe. The conflict was ended relatively peacefully by the Treaty of Teschen, of which France was a guarantor. Vergennes's strategy to prevent Britain from gaining allies from other European great powers was a success. In sharp contrast to previous wars, the British were forced to fight the entire war without a significant ally.

=== Yorktown ===
The first French expedition to America under d'Estaing returned to France in 1779. The following year, another fleet was dispatched under Admiral de Grasse.

The Expédition Particulière, a sizable force of French soldiers under the comte de Rochambeau, arrived in America in July 1780. In October 1781, the French force played a key role in the surrender of a British army at Yorktown. In spite of the large British military presence in the colonies and its continued control of several major cities, in early 1782, the British parliament passed a resolution suspending further offensives against the Americans. This did not apply to their other enemies in other theatres of war.

=== 1782 ===
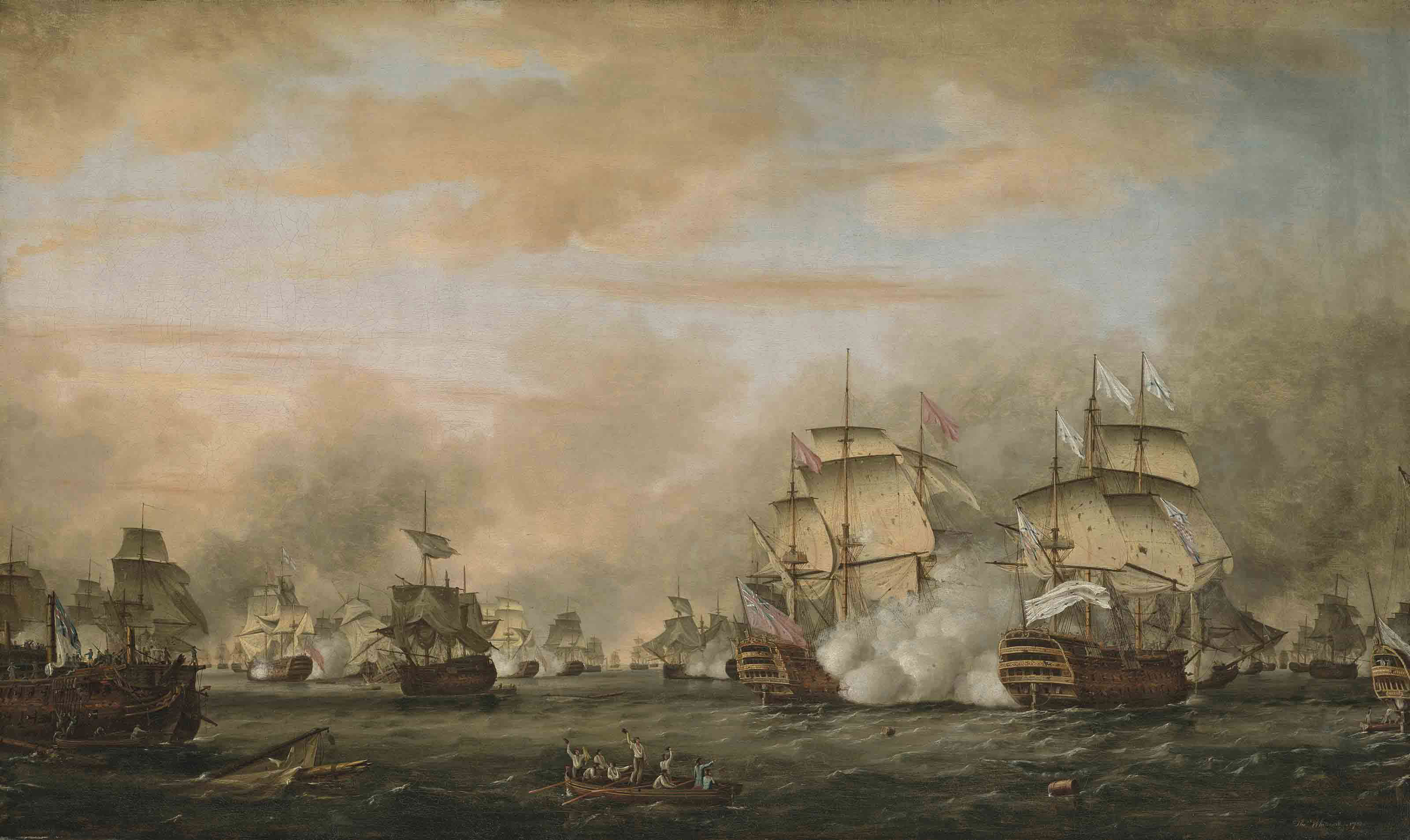
The Battle of the Saintes (1782). The defeat of the French fleet proved a major blow to the Allies' war plan for the year.

After the success at Yorktown, the French fleet went to the West Indies as part of a plan to invade Britain's colony of Jamaica. In April 1782 at the Battle of the Saintes, the French fleet suffered a major defeat and de Grasse was captured by the British. Both France and Britain understood this victory to restore British control of the high seas. Since 1779, Allied forces had laid siege to the British base at Gibraltar. In 1782, a major Franco-Spanish attack on Gibraltar failed, and the fort was relieved shortly afterward. This presented a major problem to Vergennes, as his treaty of alliance with the Spanish had committed the French to keep fighting until Gibraltar was under Spanish control. Failure to gain control of Gibraltar could potentially extend the war indefinitely.

These two defeats undermined the French confidence that had greeted the success at Yorktown. Vergennes grew increasingly pessimistic about allied prospects during the coming year. By this stage, peace negotiations were well underway. During 1782, Vergennes committed French troops to put down a democratic revolution in the Republic of Geneva, which had broken out the previous year.

== Treaty of Paris ==
By 1782 Vergennes was growing increasingly frustrated by what he regarded as the inability of the United States to justify its use of the large sums of money which France had given them. He remarked to Lafayette, who had recently returned from America, "I am not marvelously pleased with the country that you have just left. I find it barely active and very demanding." Although he continued to enjoy a warm relationship with Benjamin Franklin, the American peace commissioners John Jay and John Adams distrusted Vergennes' motives and began separate peace talks with British envoys.

When Vergennes discovered in November 1782 that the Americans had concluded a separate peace with the British, he felt betrayed, as they had previously agreed that a joint peace would be negotiated between them. In light of the generous terms that Britain had granted to the United States, although they refused to cede Canada, Vergennes remarked, "The English buy peace rather than make it."

During the negotiations leading up to the Treaty of Paris, Vergennes tried to balance the conflicting interests of France, Spain and the United States. He was largely unsympathetic to the Dutch, believing that their disappointing effort in the war did not justify his championing their goals at the peace table. He played a major role in persuading Spain to accept a peace agreement that did not give them Gibraltar; without their concession, it was likely the war would have been prolonged at least one more year, which French national finances could not afford.

France's own peace terms with Britain were completed in January 1783. Worried that another year of war would result in further British victories, Vergennes was keen to reach an agreement. France received Tobago, several trading posts in Africa, and the end of trading restrictions at Dunkirk. Vergennes claimed that France's limited gains justified his position that their participation had been disinterested. He was criticised for this by Marquis de Castries, who believed that most of the war's burdens had been on France, while most of the benefits went to her allies.

== Last years ==
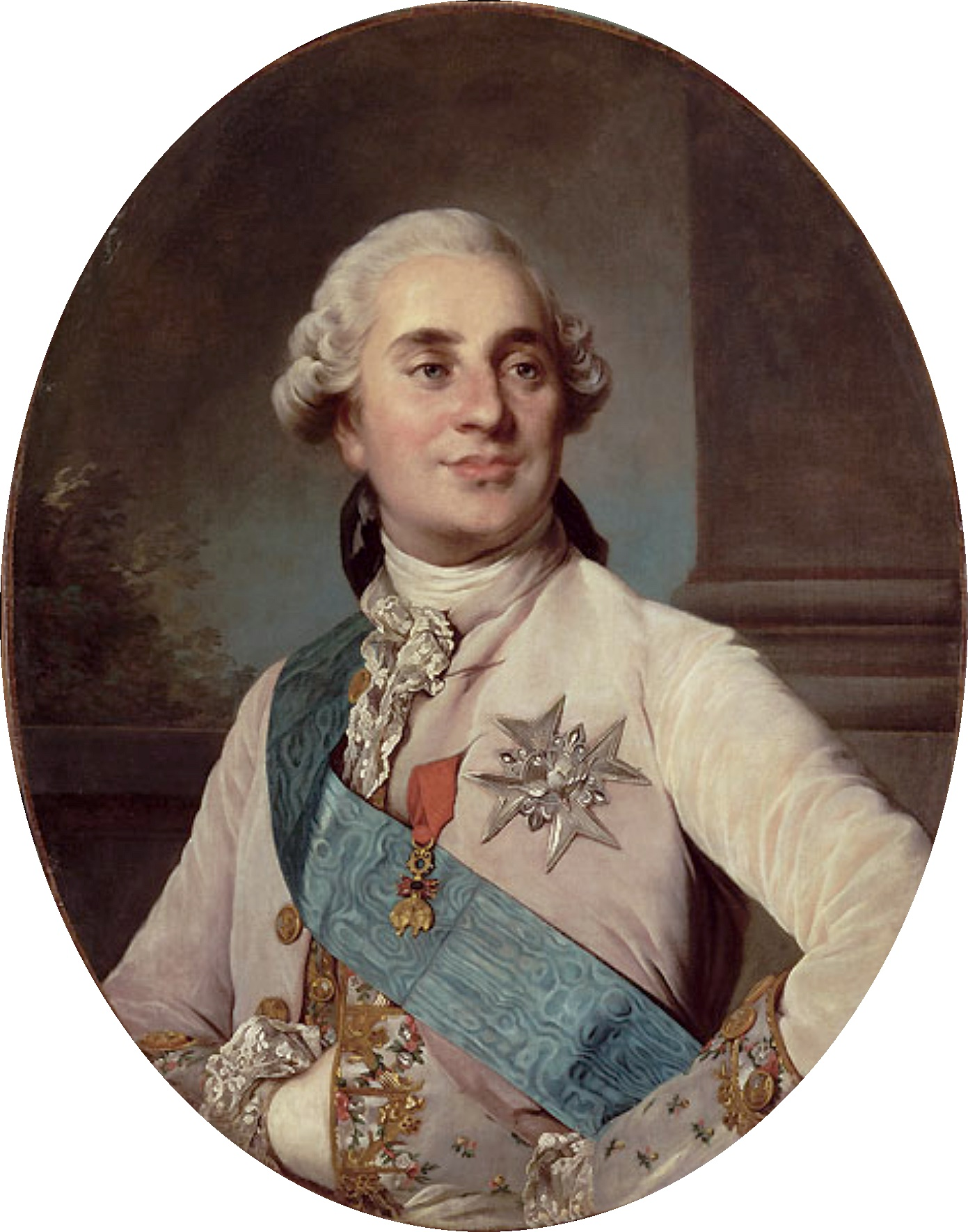
Louis XVI, who reigned from 1774 to 1792. Vergennes was his most trusted minister. The King was executed in 1793 during the French Revolution.

=== Foreign policy ===
Despite its claim of victory from the American War of Independence, France's foreign situation began to decline rapidly in the years after 1783. French resources were increasingly strained and unable to support the nation's traditional role in Europe. During the Dutch Crisis of 1787, France was unable to prevent the intervention of Prussian troops, who crushed the French-allied Patriots in the Dutch Republic. The diplomatic retreat was a contributing factor to the French Revolution.

Vergennes encouraged King Louis to sponsor expeditions to Indochina. These contributed to the French exploration and conquest under the Third French Empire.

=== Domestic politics ===
In domestic affairs, Vergennes remained conservative, carrying out intrigues to have Jacques Necker removed. He regarded Necker, a foreign Protestant, as a dangerous innovator and secret republican and was wary of his Anglophile views. In 1781, Vergennes became chief of the council of finance, and, in 1783, he supported the nomination of Charles Alexandre de Calonne as Controller-General.

Vergennes died just before the meeting of the Assembly of Notables, which he is said to have suggested to Louis XVI. The opening of the Assembly was delayed several times to accommodate him after he had grown ill from overwork, but on 13 February 1787, he died. When Louis XVI was told the news, he broke down in tears, describing Vergennes as "the only friend I could count on, the one minister who never deceived me."

After his death in 1787, the French national situation deteriorated, leading to the outbreak of the French Revolution in 1789. In January 1793, the rebels executed the King. France was soon at war with many of its neighbours. In The Terror that followed, the government imprisoned and killed many of Vergennes' contemporaries.

== Legacy and popular culture ==
American historians have often portrayed Vergennes as a visionary, because of his support for United States independence. Other historians believe that his support for a republican insurrection and the enormous cost which France incurred in the war, caused the French Revolution, which brought down the French monarchy and the system he served.

The city of Vergennes, Vermont in the United States was named after him, as promulgated by Ethan Allen and suggested by Crèvecoeur.

In 1784, Vergennes was elected an international member of the American Philosophical Society in Philadelphia.

Vergennes was played by Guillaume Gallienne in the film Marie Antoinette (2006), by Jean-Hugues Anglade in the 2008 HBO series John Adams, and by Thibault de Montalembert in the 2024 miniseries Franklin.

The Gravier family is a family of the surviving French nobility.

== See also ==
- Franco-Ottoman alliance
- Vergennes, Vermont, a city located in an area affected by the Saratoga Campaign which influenced Vergennes
- Swedish Revolution of 1772
- France in the American War of Independence

Diplomatic posts
Preceded by Roland Puchot	Ambassador to the Ottoman Empire; 1755–1768	Succeeded by François-Emmanuel Guignard
Political offices
Preceded by Henri Bertin	Minister of Foreign Affairs; 1774–1787	Succeeded by Count of Montmorin
Preceded by Count of Maurepas	Chief Minister of the French Monarch; 1781–1787	Succeeded by Archbishop de Brienne
