= Portrait of Louis XVI (Callet) =

Painting by Antoine-François Callet

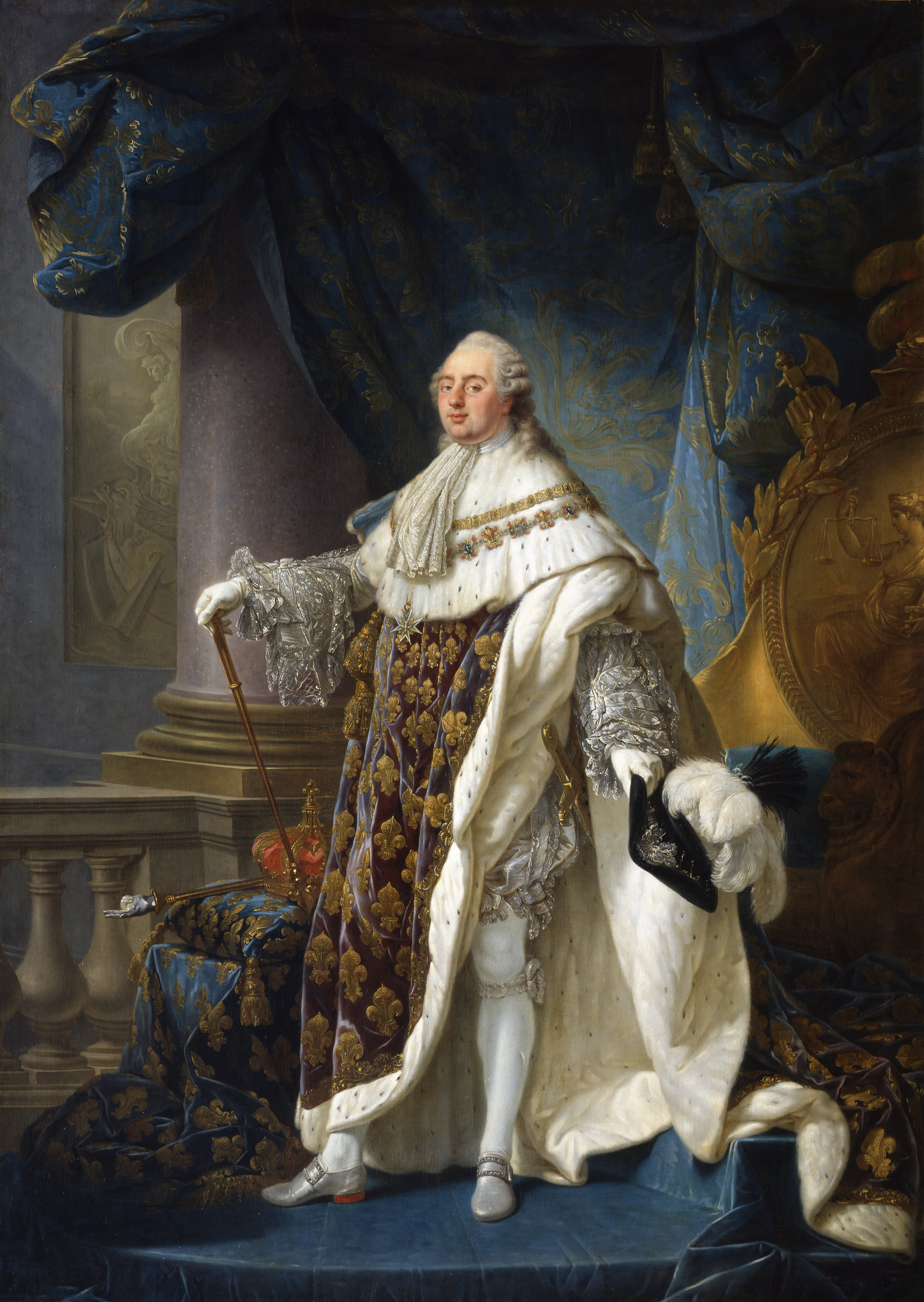
- Version in the Palace of Versailles
- Artist: Antoine-François Callet
- Year: 1779
- Type: Oil on canvas, portrait painting
- Dimensions: 278 cm × 196 cm (109 in × 77 in)
- Location: Palace of Versailles, Versailles

Portrait of Louis XVI is an oil on canvas portrait painting by the French artist Antoine-François Callet, from 1779.

== History and description ==
It depicts Louis XVI, who reigned in France from 1774 to his execution by guillotine in 1793 during the French Revolution. The painting depicts Louis at full-length in his ermine-lined robes of state, with the crown jewels beside him. The Fleur-de-lis, symbol of the French Monarchy, features prominently. Stylistically it draws on the 1701 Portrait of Louis XIV by Hyacinthe Rigaud, setting a template by which Napoleon would later be depicted.

The work was commissioned in 1778 and completed the following year. The best-known version of the painting was exhibited at the Salon of 1789 held at the Louvre, in Paris. This version is now in the collection of the Museum of French History at the Palace of Versailles. Versailles also holds a smaller, contemporary replica, commissioned by the Foreign Minister the Comte de Vergennes

Identifying which was the original painting is difficult, and it has been suggested it may be a now cut-down copy in the Musée d'Art Roger-Quilliot, in Clermont-Ferrand. It was widely replicated by Callet with other notable versions at the Prado, in Madrid and in Waddesdon Manor, in Buckinghamshire.

== See also ==
- Portrait of Louis XVI, a 1776 portrait by Joseph Duplessis

== Bibliography ==
- Porterfield, Todd & Siegfried, Susan L. Staging Empire: Napoleon, Ingres, and David. Pennsylvania State University, 2006.
