= Antoine-François Callet =

French painter (1741–1823)

Antoine-François Callet (1807)

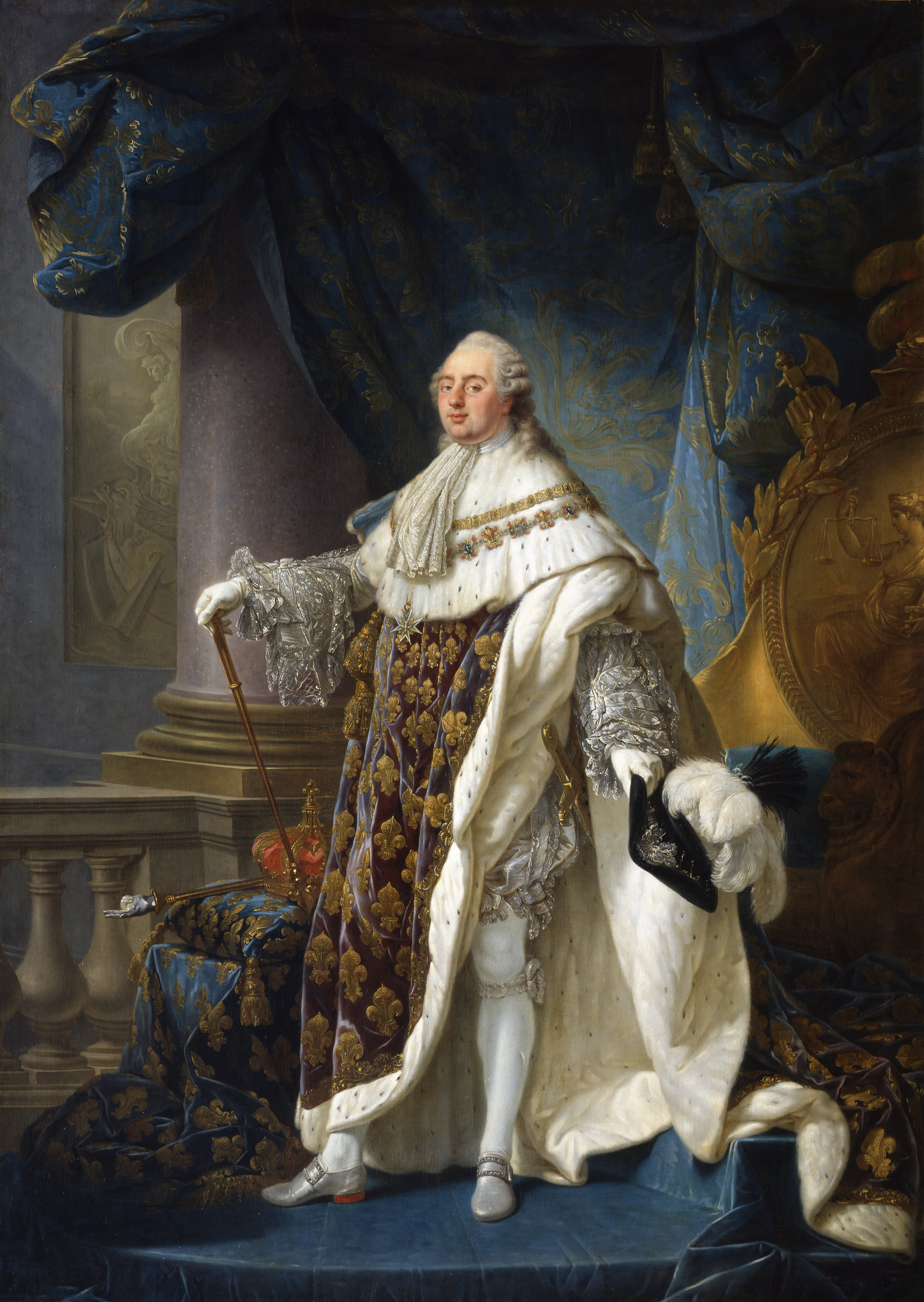
Portrait of Louis XVI, 1779

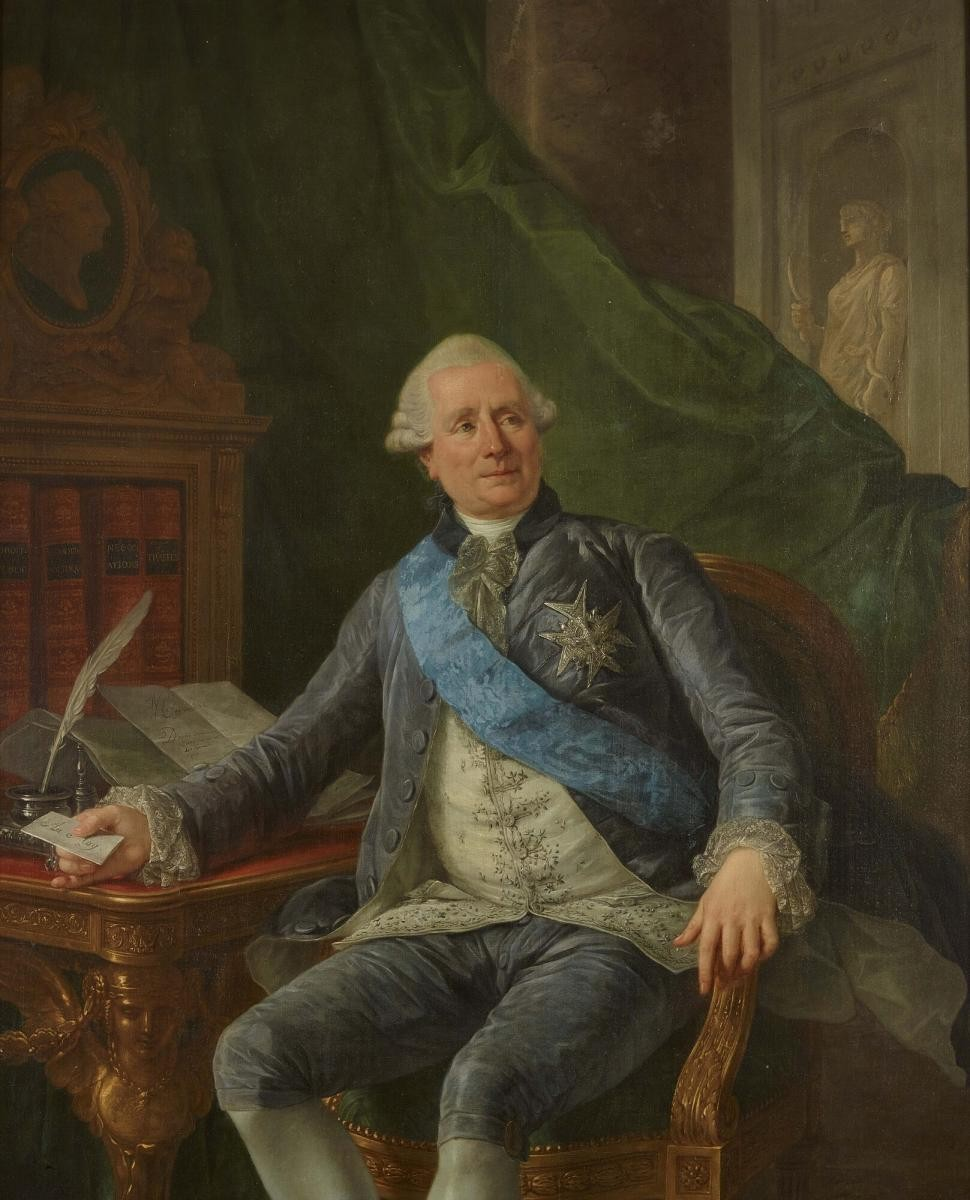
Portrait of the Comte de Vergennes, 1781, Palace of Versailles

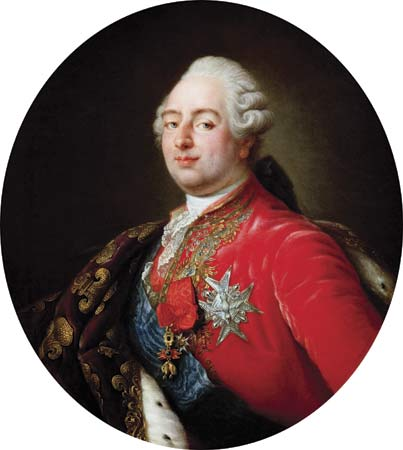
Antoine-François Callet, Portrait of Louis XVI, 1786, musée Carnavalet

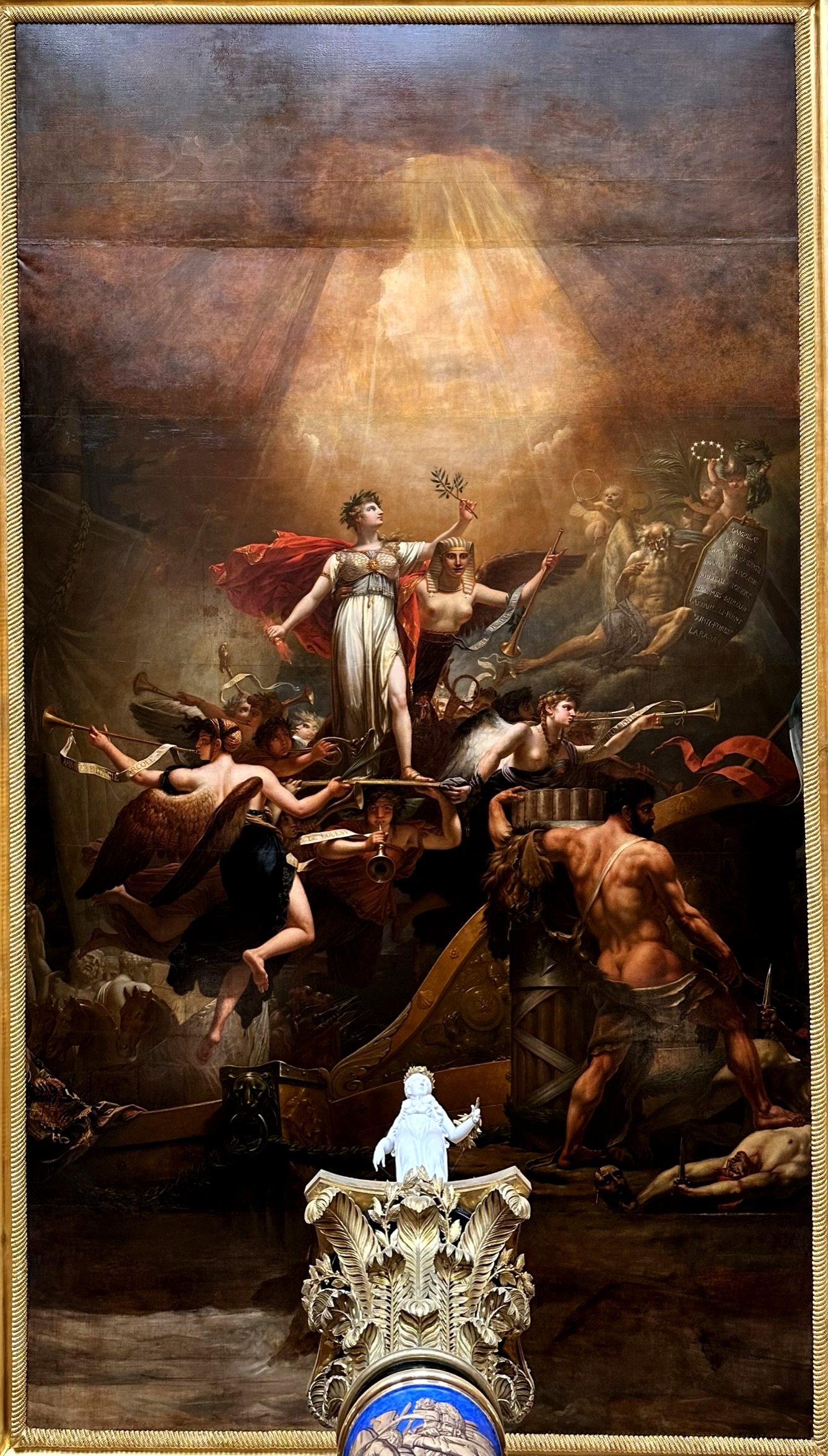
Allegory of 18 Brumaire, also known as France Saved, 1801, Palace of Versailles

Antoine-François Callet (1741–1823), generally known as Antoine Callet, was a French painter of portraits and allegorical works, who acted as official portraitist to Louis XVI.

He won the grand prix de Rome in 1764 with Cléobis et Biton conduisent le char de leur mère au temple de Junon (Kleobis and Biton dragging their mother's cart to the temple of Juno). He was accepted by the Académie des beaux arts in 1779, with his entry piece being a portrait of the comte d'Artois, and received with his allegory Le printemps (Spring) in 1781. The same year he exhibited his Portrait of the Comte de Vergennes featuring the French Foreign Minister the Count of Vergennes at the Salon of 1781 at the Louvre.

He painted the centre of the ceiling of the grande galerie of the palais du Luxembourg, with a composition entitled L'Aurore (Aurora). Under the French Consulate and the First French Empire he painted several more allegories, including an Allégorie du dix-huit brumaire ou la France sauvée (Allegory of 18 Brumaire, or France saved; 1801, château de Versailles) and an Allégorie de la bataille d'Austerlitz (Allegory of the Battle of Austerlitz; 1806, château de Versailles).

Callet died in 1823 in Paris.
