= Du Teillay (1744 ship) =

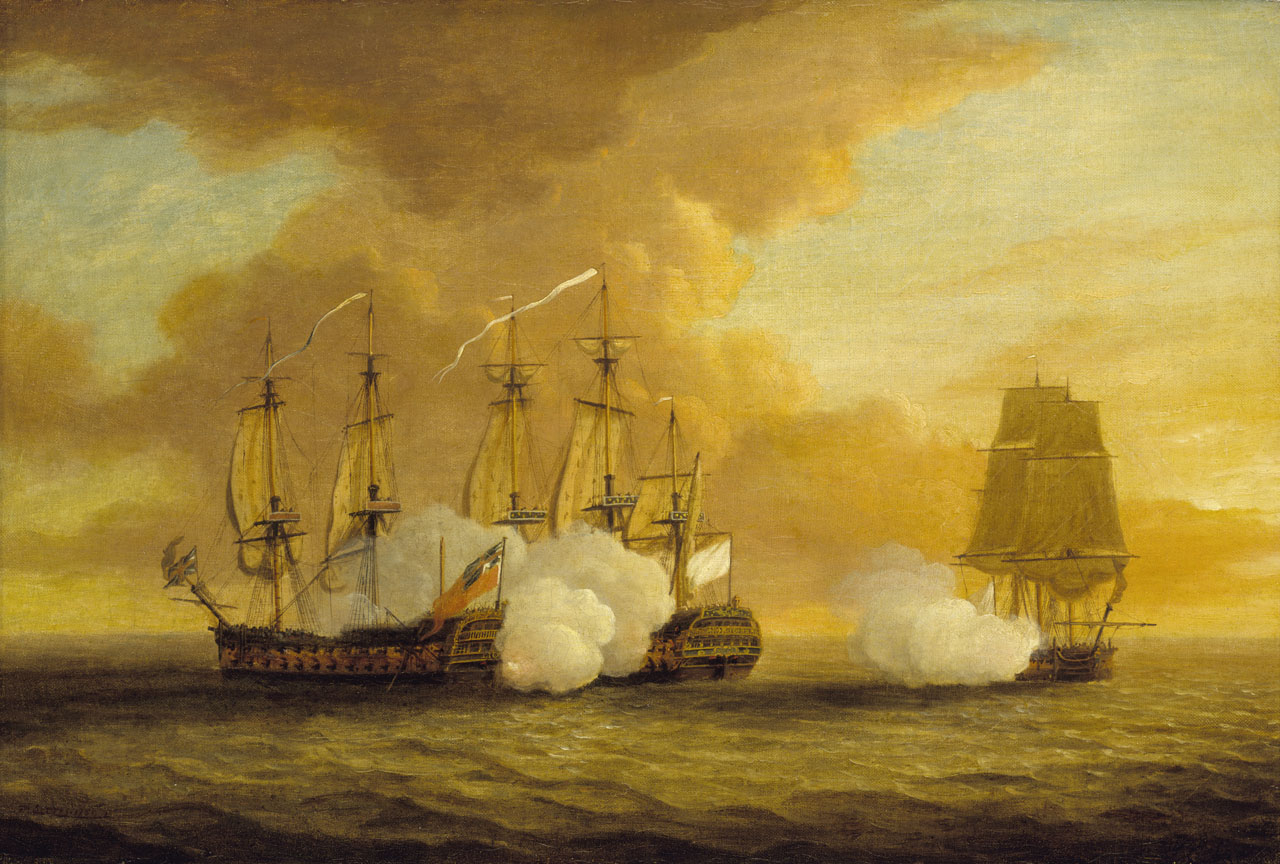
- Action between HMS Lion and Elizabeth and the Du Teillay, 9 July 1745, painting by Dominic Serres

History

France
- Name: Du Teillay; also erroneously referred to as Dentelle or Doutelle
- Builder: Nantes ?
- Launched: 1744 (?)
- Commissioned: Commissioned by Antoine Walsh as a privateer in Nantes in 1744

General characteristics
- Displacement: 150 tons
- Crew: 67 men
- Armament: 18 guns; 14 swivel guns

Du Teillay was a French privateer and slave ship commissioned in Nantes in 1744 by shipowner and slave trader Antoine Walsh. Prior to the Jacobite rising of 1745, it was involved in the Atlantic slave trade. Just prior the rebellion, the ship was used by Walsh to transport Charles Edward Stewart along with funds and supplies from France to the Sound of Arisaig in the Scottish Highlands, where Stewart proclaimed his intention to rebel and raised his royal standard. On 9 July 1745, Du Teillay was involved in a naval engagement with the Royal Navy before sailing to Amsterdam.

== Career ==
She saw action on 9 July 1745 (according to the old style date, or 20 July 1745 according to the Calendar (New Style) Act 1750 adopting the new Gregorian calendar), when she accompanied by the ship Elizabeth (L'Elisabeth) she was fired upon by HMS Lion. The Du Teillay at the time was carrying Charles to Scotland. Prince Charles had boarded the French ship on 2 July 1745 (New Style date) and left Saint-Nazaire on 3 July 1745 (New style date) bound for Loch Nan Uamh. They were joined by a French escort ship the Elizabeth on the island of Belle-Ile of the south-west coast of Brittany, but not until 13 July 1745 (New Style date). The ships departed from Belle-Ile on 15 July 1745 (New Style date). A few days later, they were intercepted by the Lion, commanded by Captain Piercy Brett off the West coast of Brittany, south of Cape Lizard. A close action began at 17:00 between the Lion and Elizabeth, with the Du Teillay attacking the ‘Lion’ several times and, at 18:00, the ‘Lion’s’ mizzen topmast came down. By 20:00, The Lion, with her mizzen top and topmast shot away and hanging over the side, was still in close action with the Elizabeth. The Du Teillay shielded by the Elizabeth continued firing at the ‘Lion’ who returned fire with her stern guns. The Lion continued firing at the Elizabeth until the latter broke free at 22:00 to join the Du Teillay; by this time the Lion was too damaged to follow, with 52 of her men were dead and about 110 wounded. The Elizabeth had lost about 57 men with 175 wounded with her commander, Captain Pierre Dehau and his brother Charles, among the dead, obliging the ship's second captain Pierre-Jean Bart to give up and return to Brest for repairs, leaving the Du Teillay to proceed alone.

On 23 July 1745 (Old Style), i.e. 2 August 1745 (New Style), the Du Teillay arrived at Eriskay in the Outer Hebrides with his 'seven men of Moidart', before sailing onto Loch nan Uamh where Charles landed two days later at Borrodale to meet the Laird Angus McDonald of Clanranald. The ship then sailed to the head of Lochailort and, from 10 August 1745 (N.S.) onwards, i.e. 30 July 1745 (O.S.), the ship's captain gave the order to unload its cargo of weapons, ammunitions and supplies. The ship then returned to Loch Nan Uamh on 6 August 1745 (O.S.). The ship owner's, Antoine Walsh, receives letters from the hands of the Prince on 7 August 1745 (O.S.). The ship left Charles in Borrodale, before continuing its journey on 8 August 1745 (O.S.) around the north of Scotland to the continent. The ship reached the bay of Pampus, on the east of Amsterdam, on 3 September 1745 (N.S.) before Antoine Walsh sent orders for the ship to be sold. The Du Teillay sailed in Amsterdam under the Dutch flag on 16 September 1745 (N.S.) i.e. on 5 September 1745 (O.S.).
