= HMS Lion (1709) =

Fourth-rate ship of the line

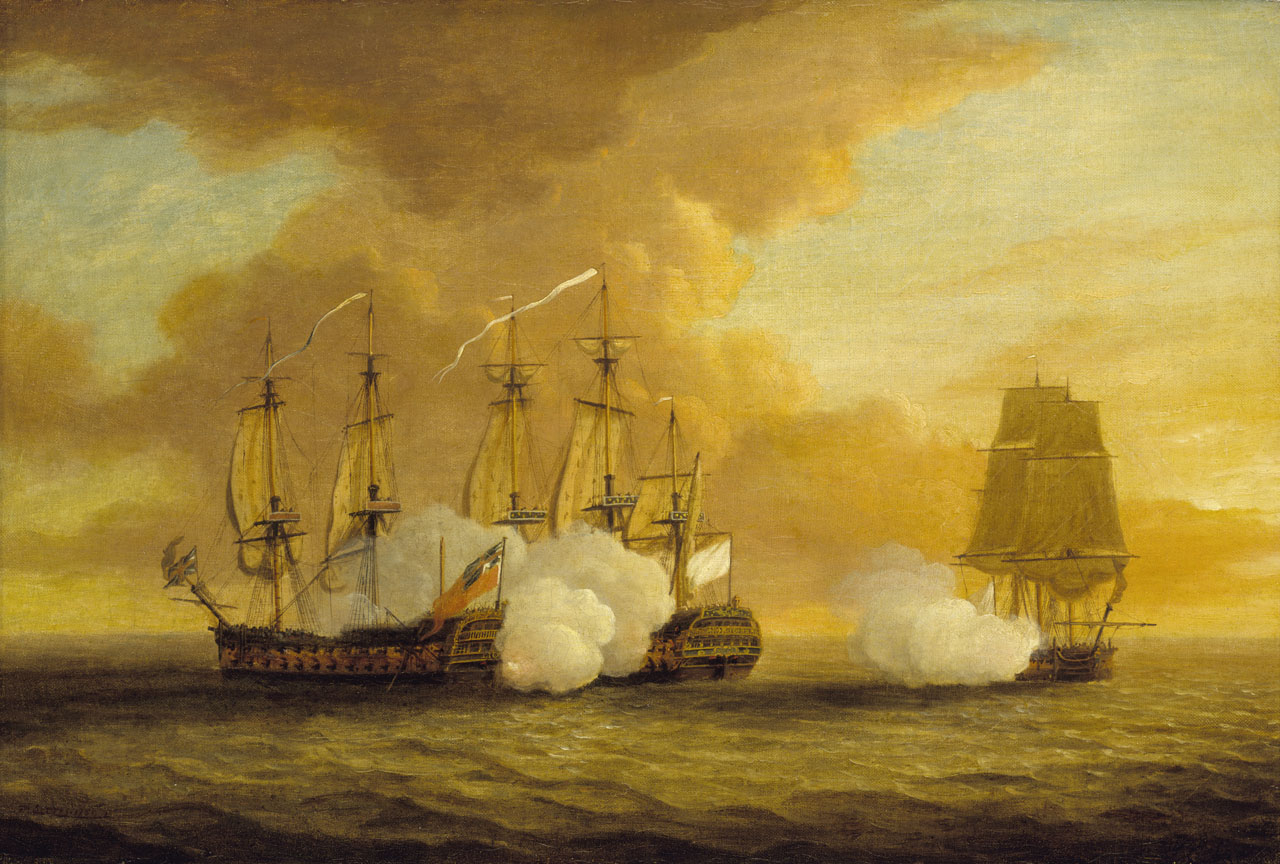
- HMS Lion attacks two French vessels carrying Prince Charles onboard, 9 July 1745

History

Great Britain
- Name: HMS Lion
- Builder: Rosewell, Chatham Dockyard
- Launched: 20 January 1709
- Honours and awards: Second Battle of Cape Finisterre, 1747
- Fate: Sold, 1765

General characteristics as built
- Class & type: 1706 Establishment 60-gun fourth rate ship of the line
- Tons burthen: 914 bm
- Length: 144 ft (43.9 m) (gundeck)
- Beam: 38 ft (11.6 m)
- Depth of hold: 15 ft 8 in (4.8 m)
- Propulsion: Sails
- Sail plan: Full-rigged ship
- Armament: 60 guns: Gundeck: 24 × 24-pdrs; Upper gundeck: 26 × 9-pdrs; Quarterdeck: 8 × 6-pdrs; Forecastle: 2 × 6-pdrs

General characteristics after 1738 rebuild
- Class & type: 1733 proposals 60-gun fourth rate ship of the line
- Tons burthen: 1,068 bm
- Length: 144 ft (43.9 m) (gundeck)
- Beam: 41 ft 5 in (12.6 m)
- Depth of hold: 16 ft 11 in (5.2 m)
- Propulsion: Sails
- Sail plan: Full-rigged ship
- Armament: 60 guns: Gundeck: 24 × 24-pdrs; Upper gundeck: 26 × 9-pdrs; Quarterdeck: 8 × 6-pdrs; Forecastle: 2 × 6-pdrs

HMS Lion or Lyon was a 60-gun fourth rate ship of the line of the Royal Navy, built at Chatham Dockyard to the 1706 Establishment and launched on 20 January 1709.

== Career ==
On 17 October 1709 Capt. Galfridus Walpole, the youngest son of Sir Robert Walpole, was appointed captain of Lion (50 cannons). He maintained that post till 1714.

On 22 March 1711, Lion was with other Royal Navy vessels in Vado Bay on the Italian coast when four French enemy ships were sighted. She and others gave chase and engaged the enemy for about two hours. Forty of Lion's crew were killed, and Walpole was so badly injured that his right arm was amputated by the ship's surgeon John Atkins. Walpole's sword from the time of this engagement was subsequently gifted to a young Horatio Nelson and was still in his possession when he too lost his right arm in the Battle of Santa Cruz de Tenerife on 15 July 1797.

In September 1712, together with HMS Cornwall, Mary and HMS Superb, assisted Admiral John Jennings with landing troops at Barcelona.

On 9 December 1735 orders were issued for Lion to be dismantled and rebuilt according to the 1733 proposals of the 1719 Establishment at Deptford, from where she was relaunched on 25 April 1738.

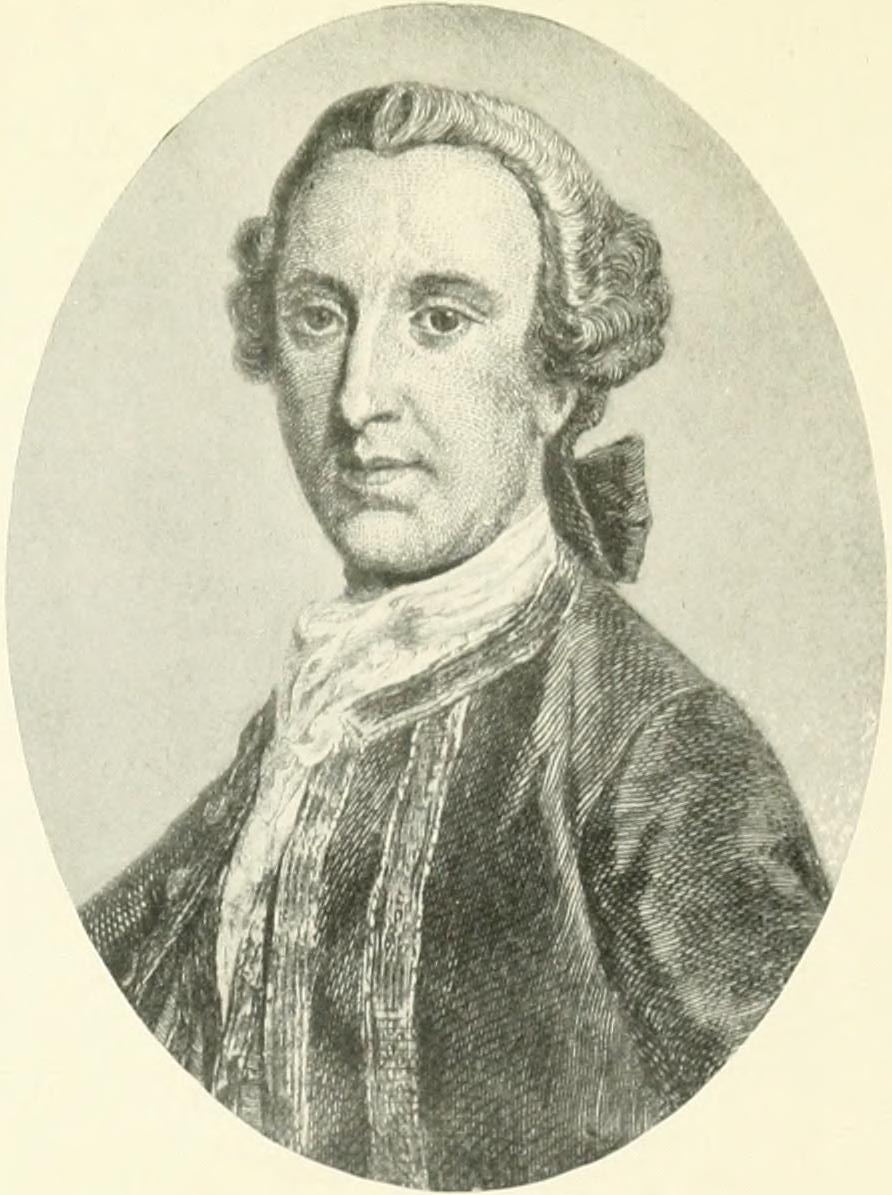
Sir Peircy Brett

During the Jacobite rising she saw action on 9 July 1745, when she exchanged fire with the French ships Elizabeth and the Du Teillay. The Lion is described as 58 guns with a crew of 400. The Du Teillay at the time was carrying Charles Edward Stuart to Scotland with supplies and funds to support his cause. Prince Charles had boarded the French ship on 7 July at Saint-Nazaire bound for Ardmolich; they were joined by a French escort ship the Elizabeth (L'Elisabeth). Two days later they were intercepted by the Lion, commanded by Captain Piercy Brett. A close action began at 17:00 between the Lion and Elizabeth, with the Du Teillay attacking the Lion several times and, at 18:00, the Lions’ mizzen topmast came down. By 20:00, The Lion with her mizzen top and topmast shot away and hanging over the side was still in close action with the Elizabeth. The Du Teillay shielded by the Elizabeth continued firing at the Lion, who returned fire with her stern guns. The Lion continued firing at the Elizabeth until the latter broke free at 22:00 to join the Du Teillay; by this time the Lion was too damaged to follow (she had also taken extensive damage to the hull); with 45 of her men dead and about 107 wounded. The Elizabeth had lost about 57 men with 175 wounded, her commander, Captain Dau, among the dead. On 2 August 1745, the Du Teillay landed Charles Stuart at Eriskay, and then onto Loch nan Uamh, Scotland, before returning to France.

Captain Brett, who was wounded in the battle, was obliged to have the captain of the Marines arrested for skulking on the poop under cover of some bags, setting such a bad example that it encouraged most of his men to do likewise. Dominic Serres painted a version of the event in 1860, from three drawings done at the time by Peircy Brett.

In April 1747 Lion was part of a small squadron under the overall command of Thomas Fox on HMS Kent, consisting of HMS Hampton Court, HMS Eagle, HMS Chester, HMS Hector, and two fireships. They cruised between Ushant and Cape Finisterre in an attempt to intercept a large merchant fleet that was sailing from San Domingo to France. After a month at sea they encountered the convoy, which consisted of some 170 ships carrying a cargo of cochineal, cotton, indigo and other valuable commodities. They were escorted by four French warships, who fled upon the approach of the British fleet. Fox's squadron captured 46 merchants, and dispersed the rest. Some were later captured by smaller British warships operating in the area.

In January 1748 Charles Watson was appointed commander-in-chief of the Newfoundland and North American station with his flag in HMS Lion.

Lion continued in service until 1765, when she was sold out of the navy.

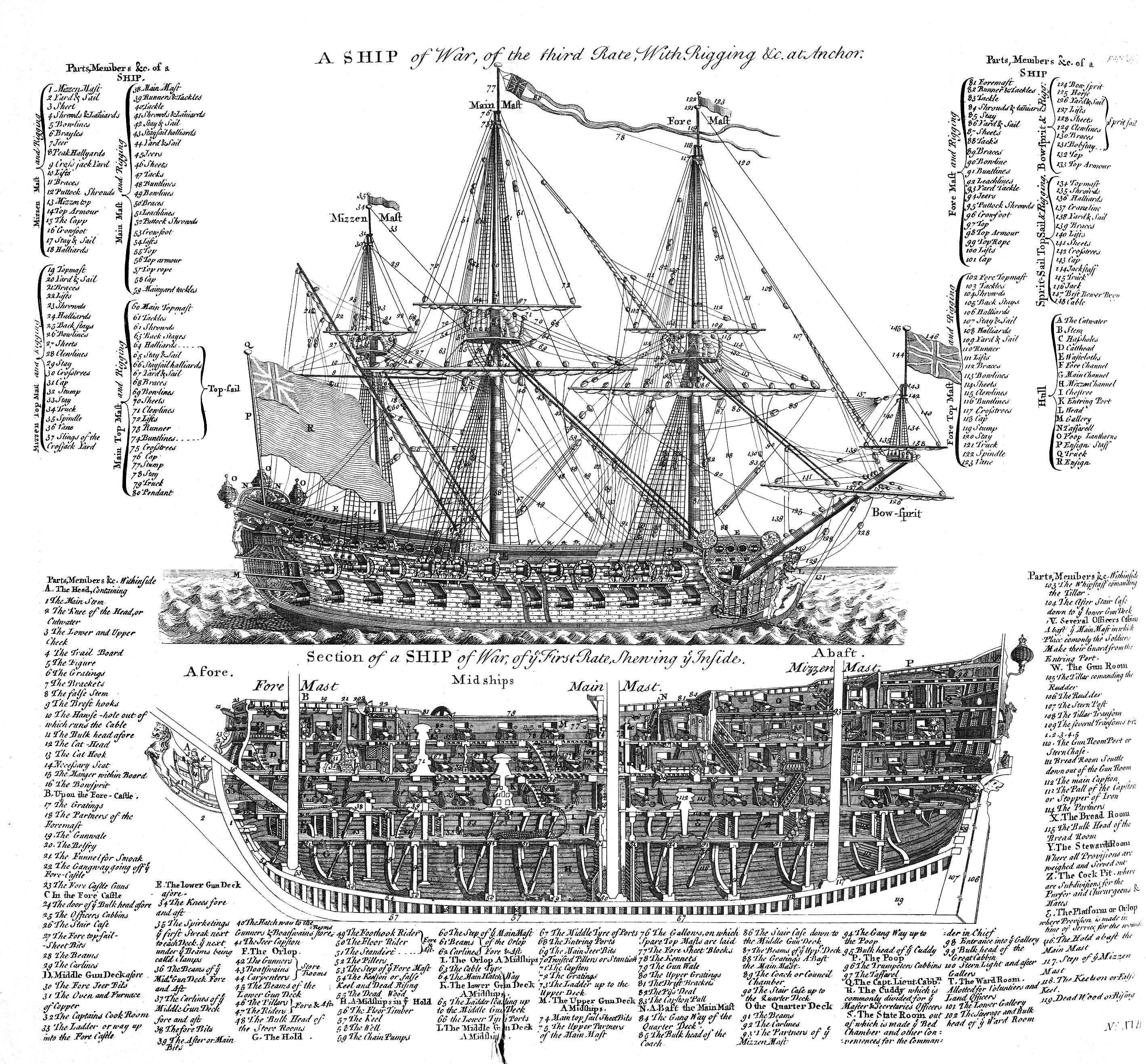
A ship of the period, c.1728 - (possibly the Lion herself)
