= Salon of 1777 =

1777 art exhibition in Paris

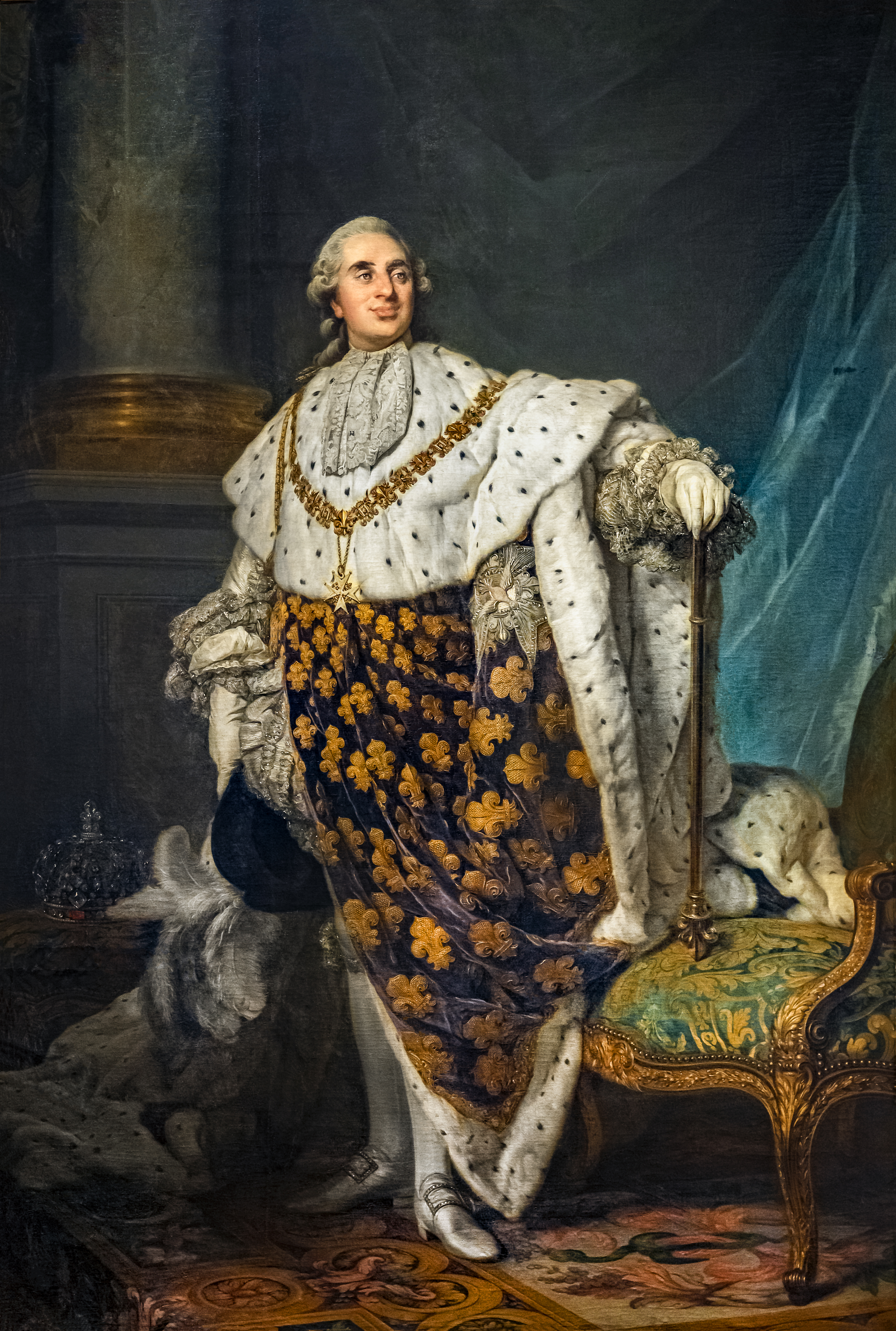
Portrait of Louis XVI by Joseph Duplessis

The Salon of 1777 was an art exhibition held at the Louvre in Paris. Part of the regular series of Salons organised by the Académie Royale, it ran from 25 August to 25 September 1777. It was the second to take place during the reign of Louis XVI following the Salon of 1775. As was traditional it opened on the feast day of Saint Louis.

The Coronation of Louis XVI in 1775 had been the first coronation of a French monarch in sixty years. The noted portraitist Joseph-Siffred Duplessis displayed his Portrait of Louis XVI, a picture of the new king in his coronation robes. The image was widely reproduced and a number versions exist. This cemented the artist's rapid rise to the top rank of painters. His portrait of Eléonore Elisabeth Angélique de Beauterne, now in the Metropolitan Museum of Art, was praised for its naturalism.

Neoclassicism was strongly represented. François-André Vincent displayed fifteen paintings including two notable scenes from ancient history Alcibiades Being Taught by Socrates and Belisarius. Vincent became a major rival of Jacques-Louis David, who as this time was still at the French Academy in Rome with their joint mentor Joseph-Marie Vien. The sculptor Jean-Antoine Houdon featured a number of works including a bust of Diana and Morphée. Hubert Robert displayed views of the gardens at the Palace of Versailles, commissioned by Louis XVI to show in the process of being redesigned.

Nicolas-Guy Brenet exhibited the history painting Homage Rendered to Du Guesclin featuring a scene featuring Bertrand du Guesclin from the Hundred Years War. This marked a new direction in French history painting, encouraged by Count of Angiviller as the new director-general of the Bâtiments du Roi. A pendant piece The Continence of Bayard was commissioned by Angiviller from Louis Jean-Jacques Durameau. Brenet also displayed Jeune femme levant un voile.

Michel-Barthélémy Ollivier's Afternoon Tea at the Temple depicts the child prodigy Wolfgang Amadeus Mozart performing on the harpsichord for a gathering at the Parisian residence of the Prince of Conti during the Mozart family grand tour in the 1760s.

It was followed by the Salon of 1779, the first to take place following France's entry into the American War of Independence.

== Gallery ==
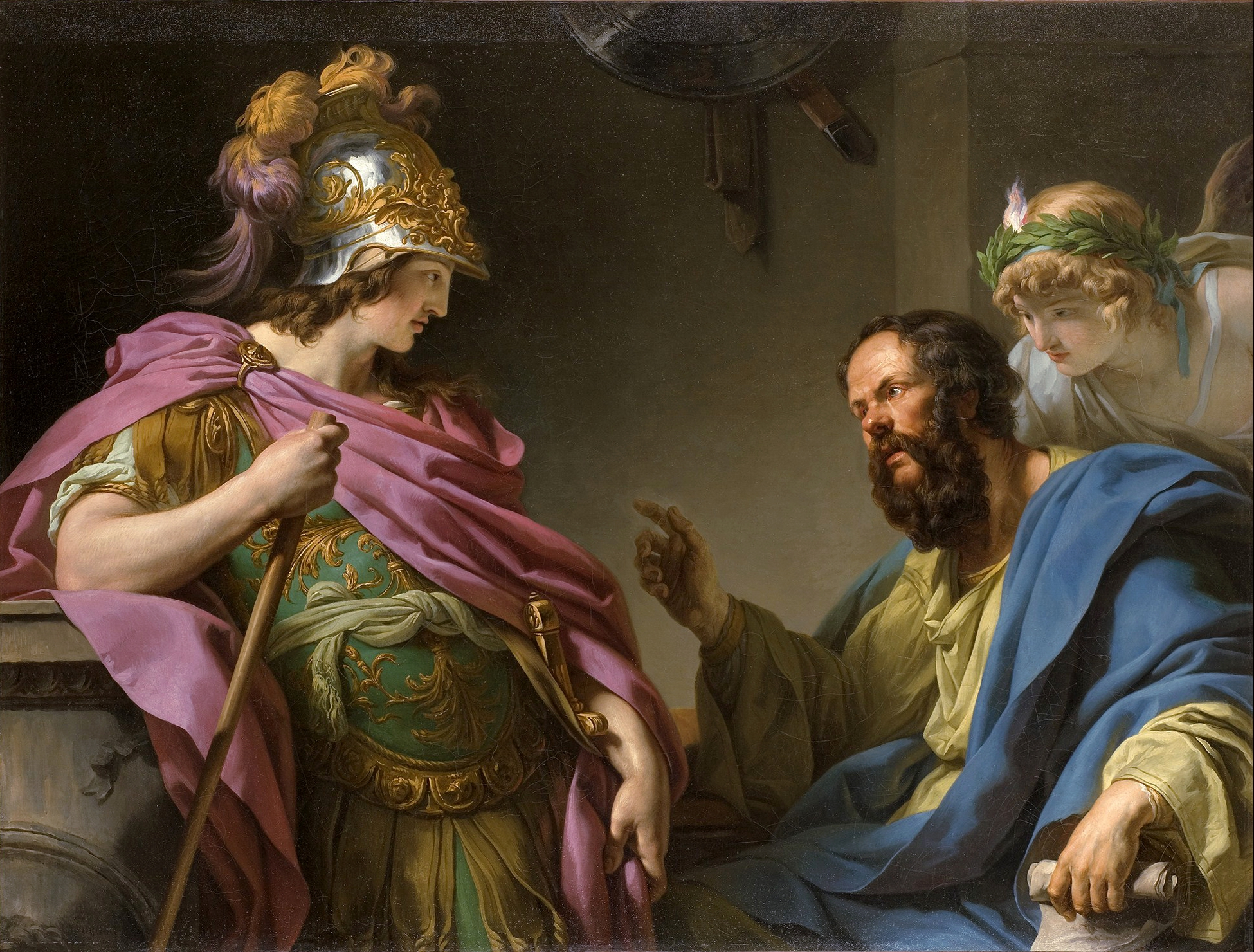
Alcibiades Being Taught by Socrates by François-André Vincent

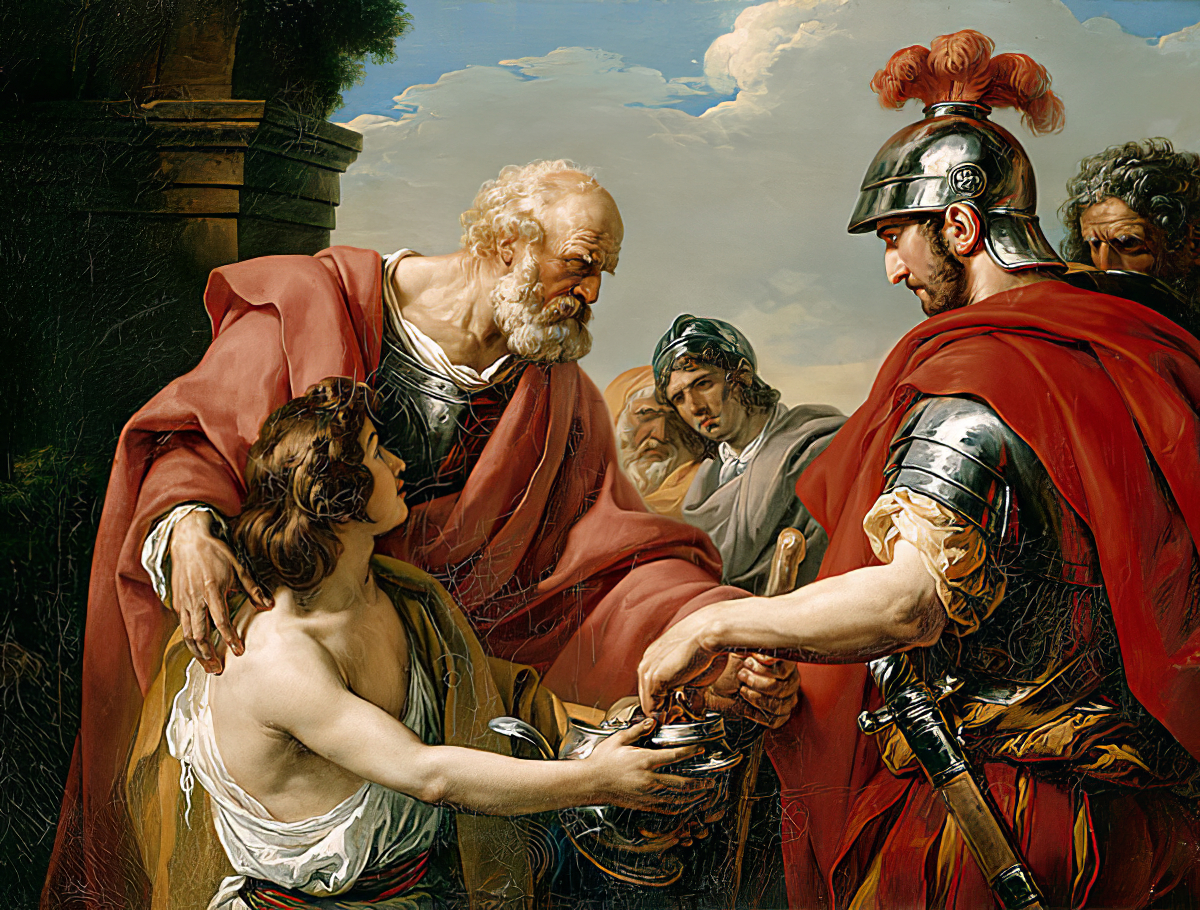
Belisarius by François-André Vincent

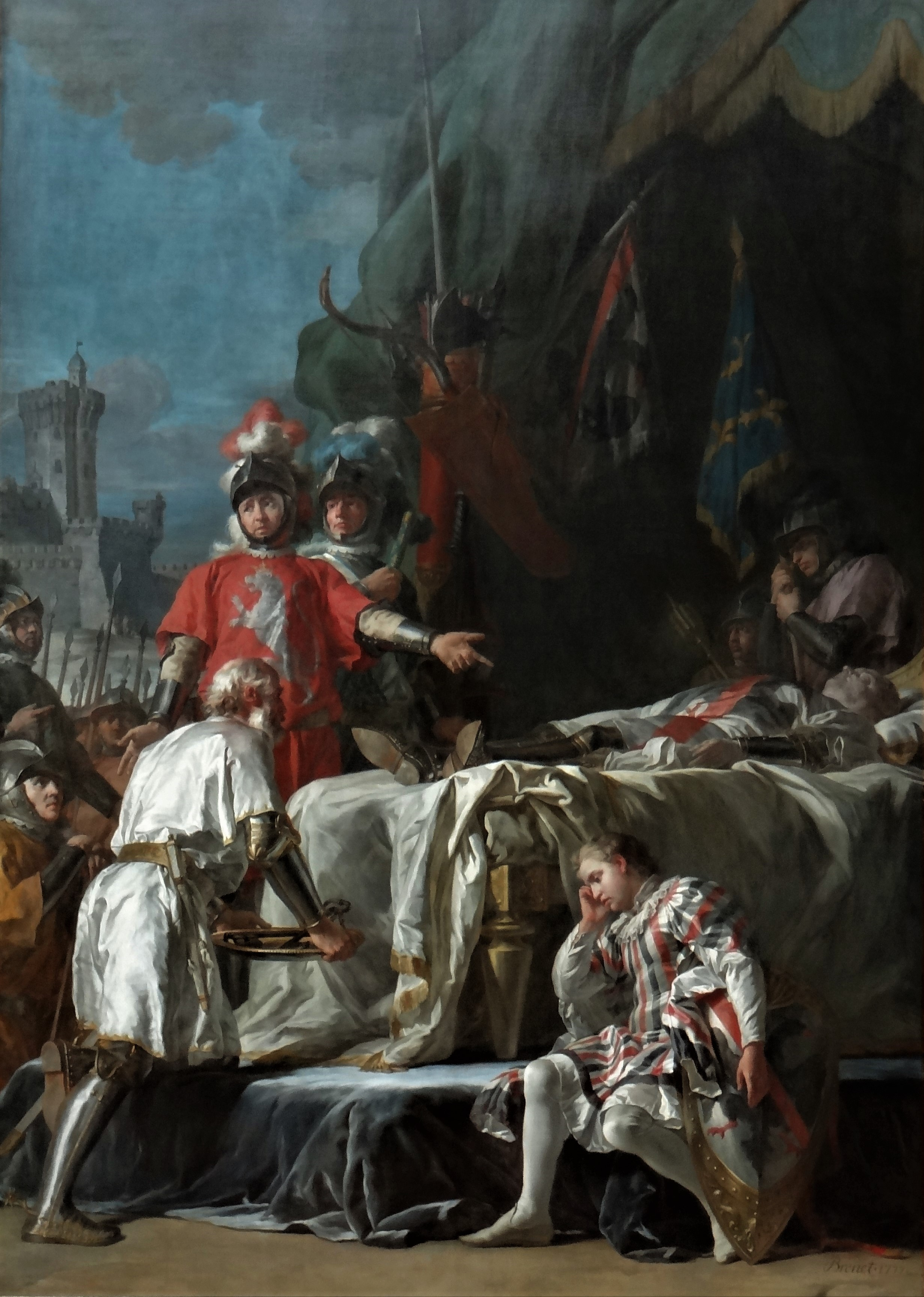
Homage Rendered to Du Guesclin by Nicolas-Guy Brenet

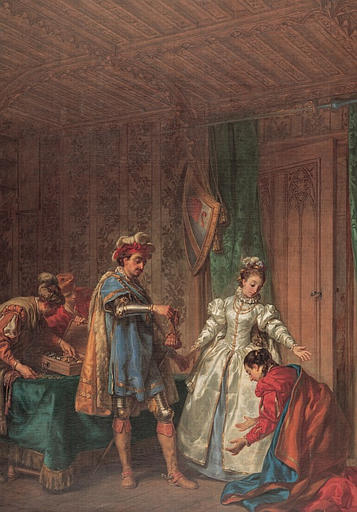
The Continence of Bayard by Louis Jean-Jacques Durameau

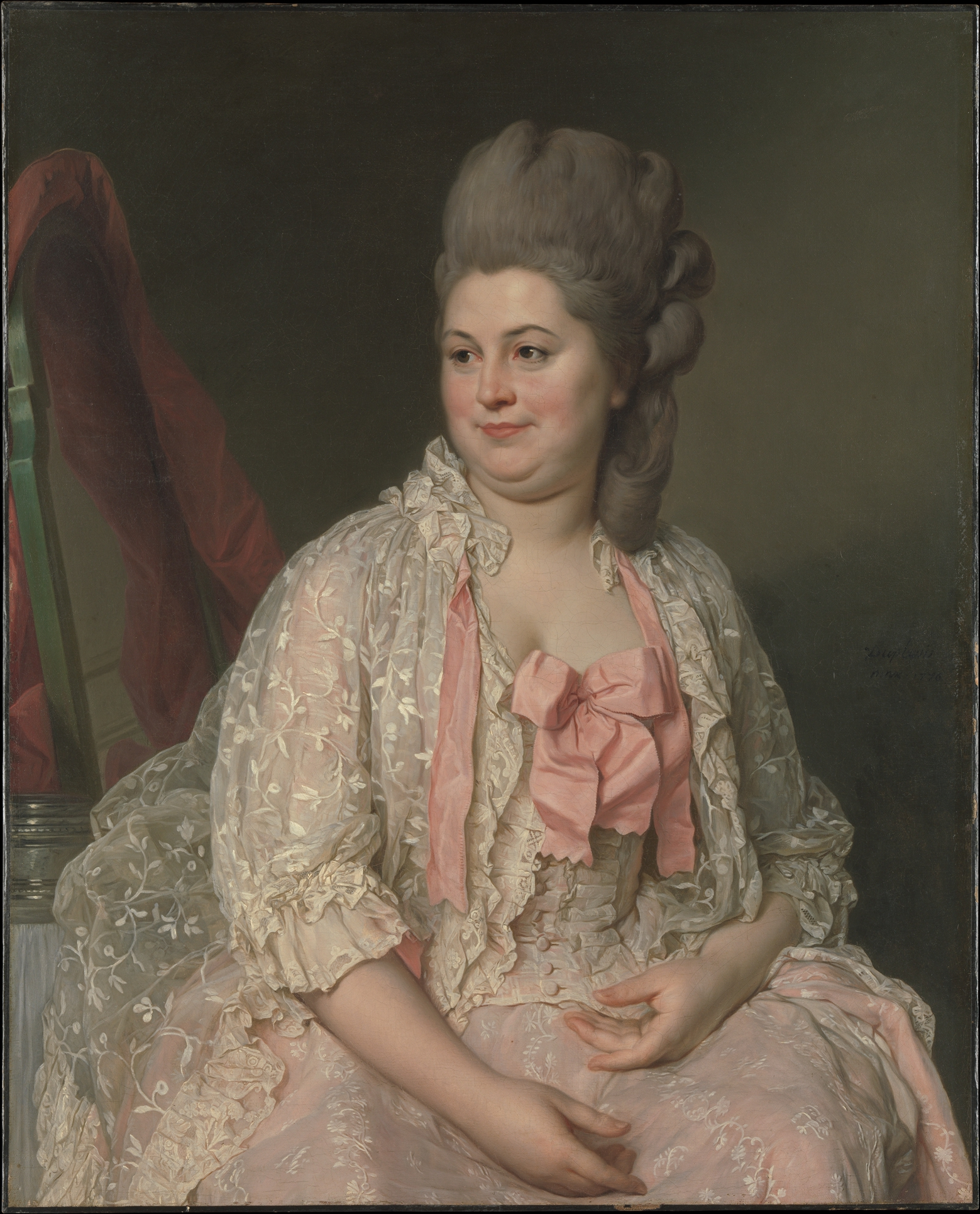
Portrait of Eléonore Elisabeth Angélique de Beauterne by Joseph-Siffred Duplessis

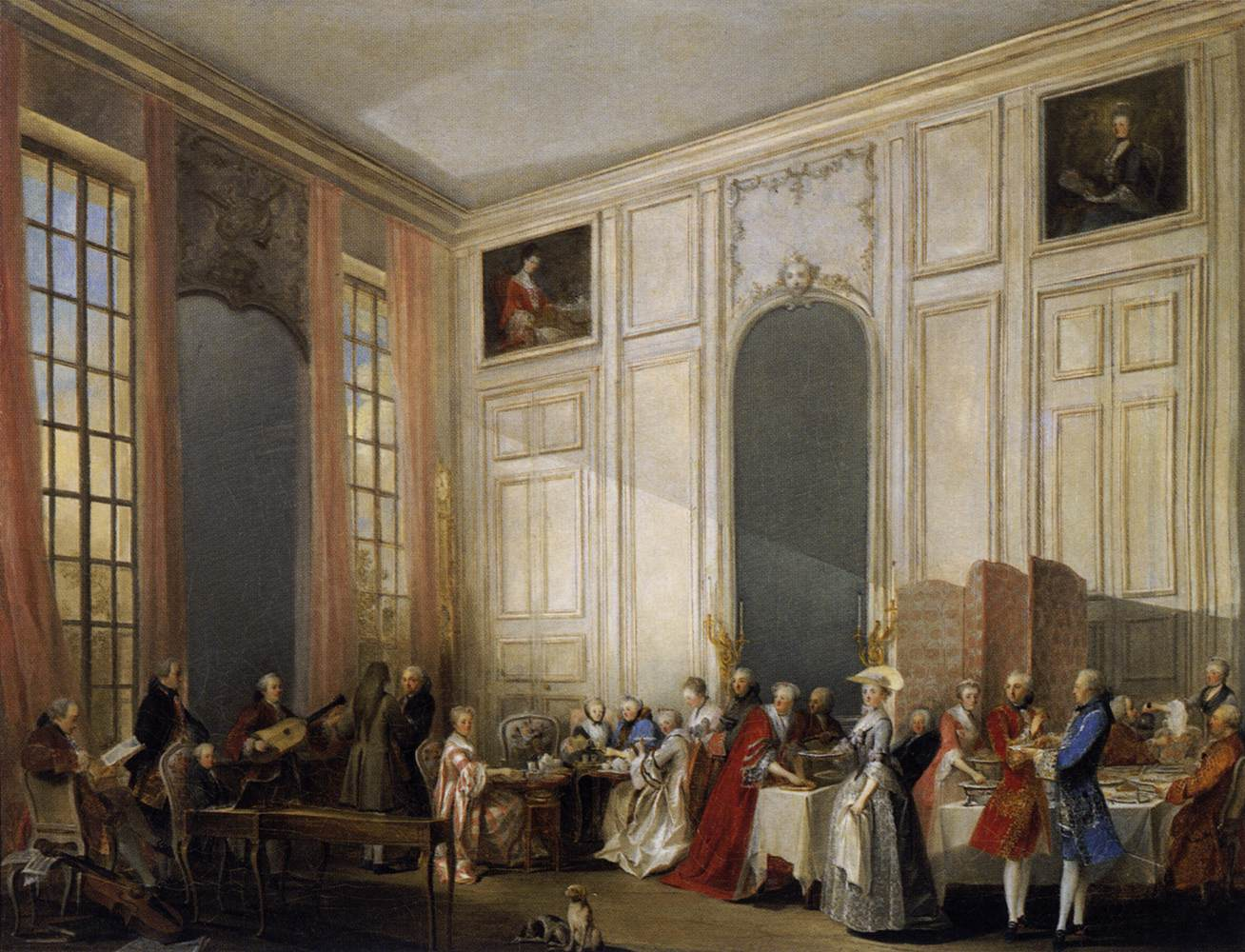
Afternoon Tea at the Temple by Michel-Barthélémy Ollivier

A Young Woman Lifting Her Veil by Nicolas-Guy Brenet

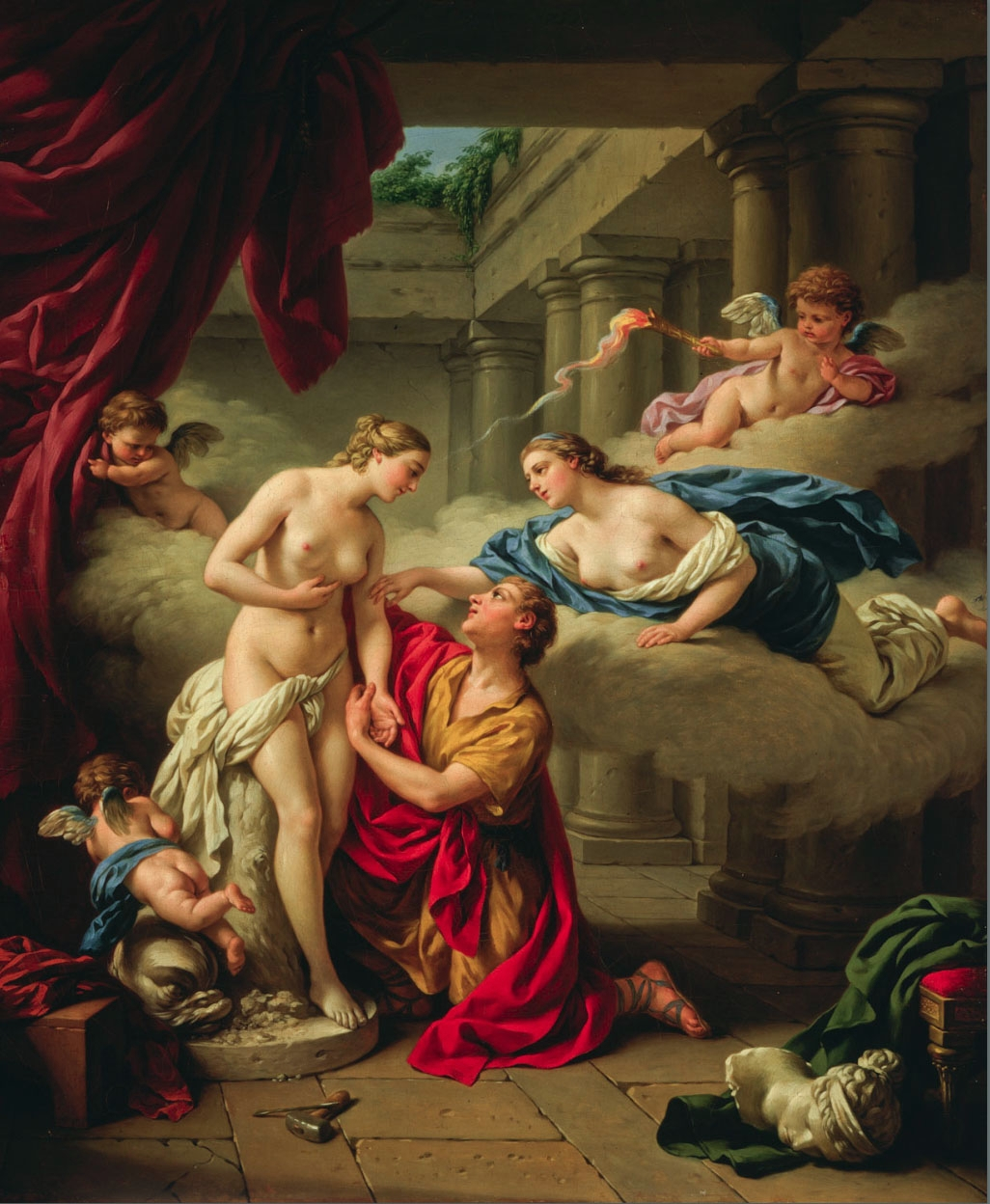
Pygmalion and His Statue by Louis-Jean-François Lagrenée

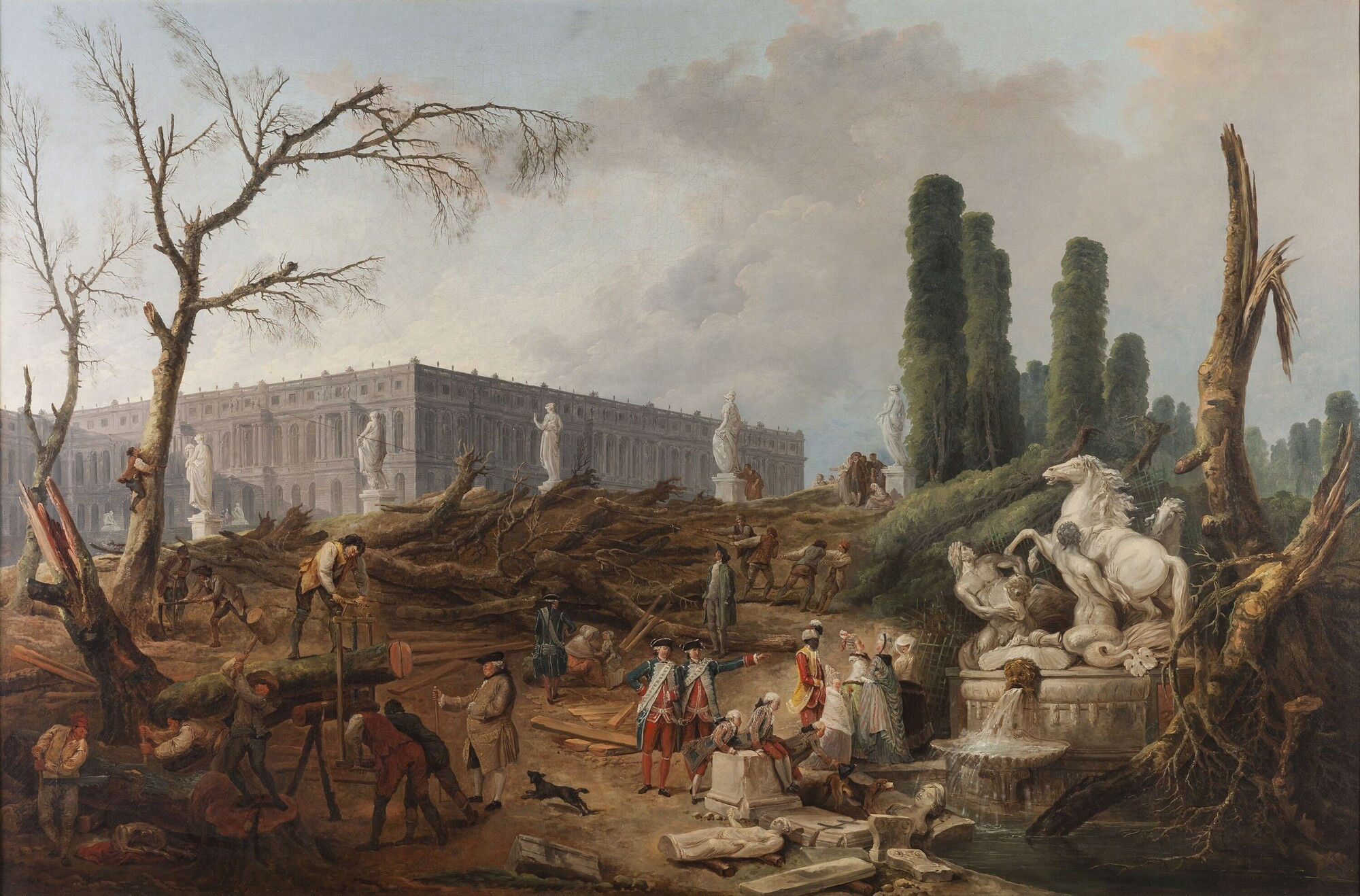
Le bosquet des bains d'Apollon à Versailles en 1777 by Hubert Robert

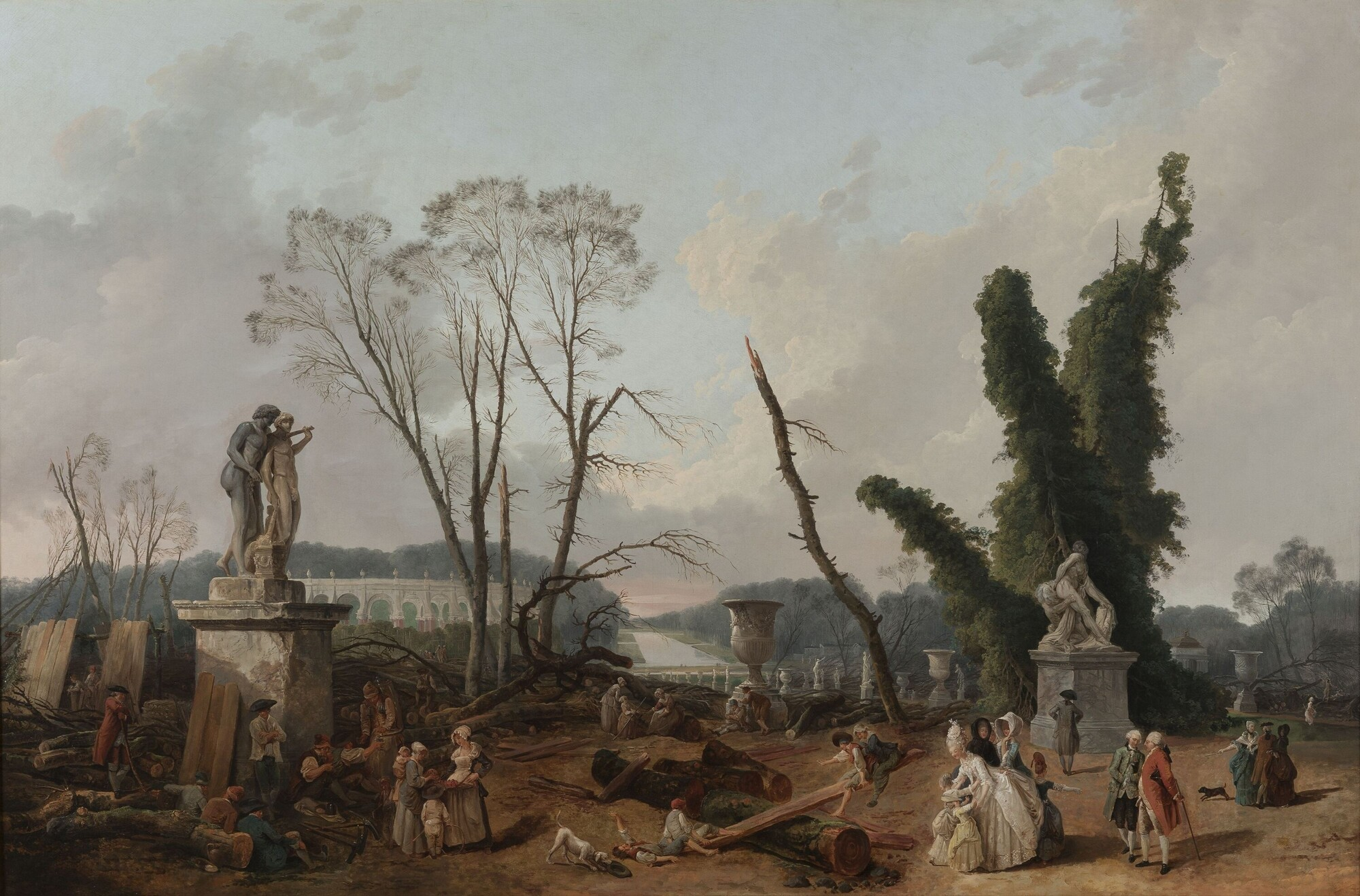
L'entrée du Tapis vert by Hubert Robert

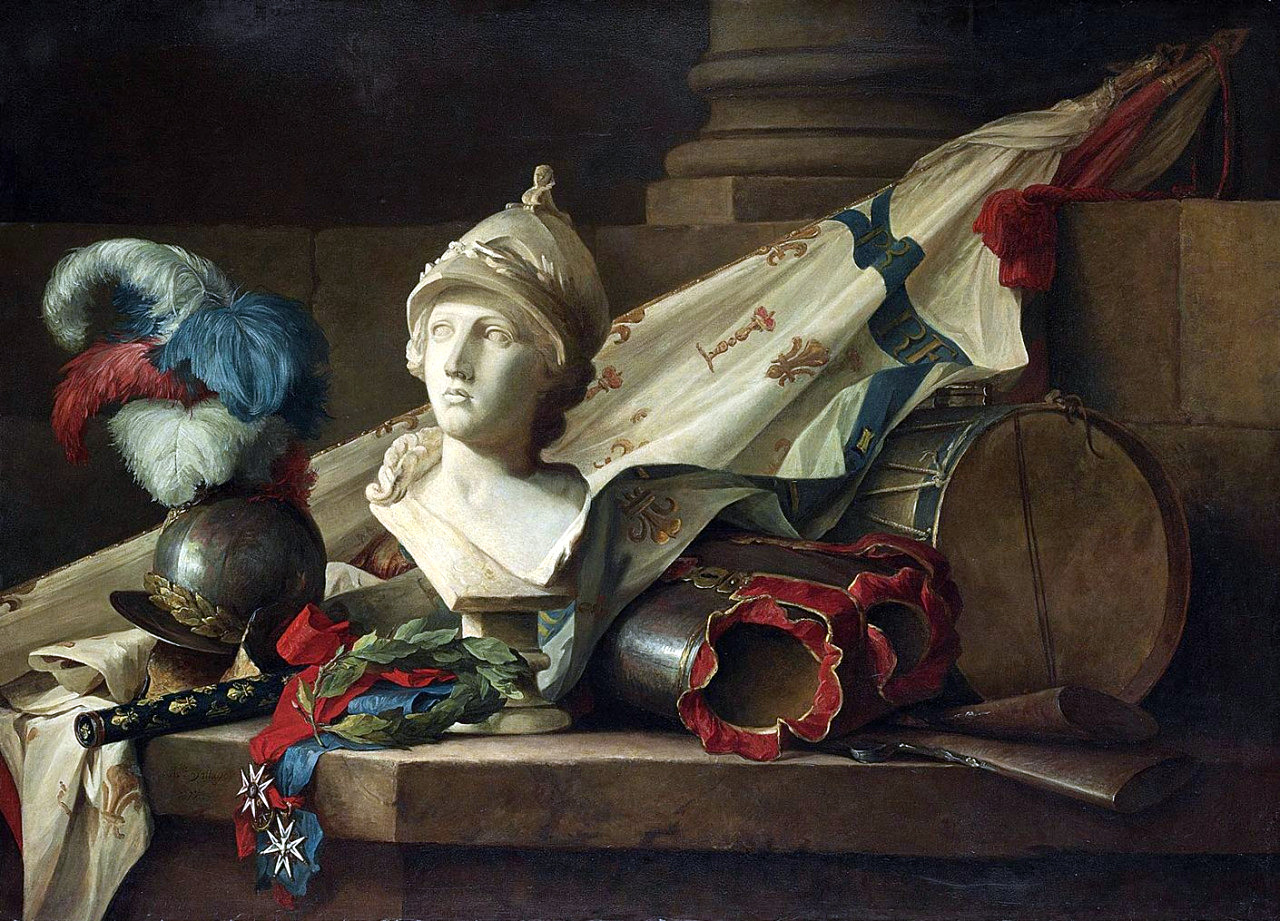
A Bust of Minerva with Armour and Weapons on a Stone Ledge by Anne Vallayer-Coster

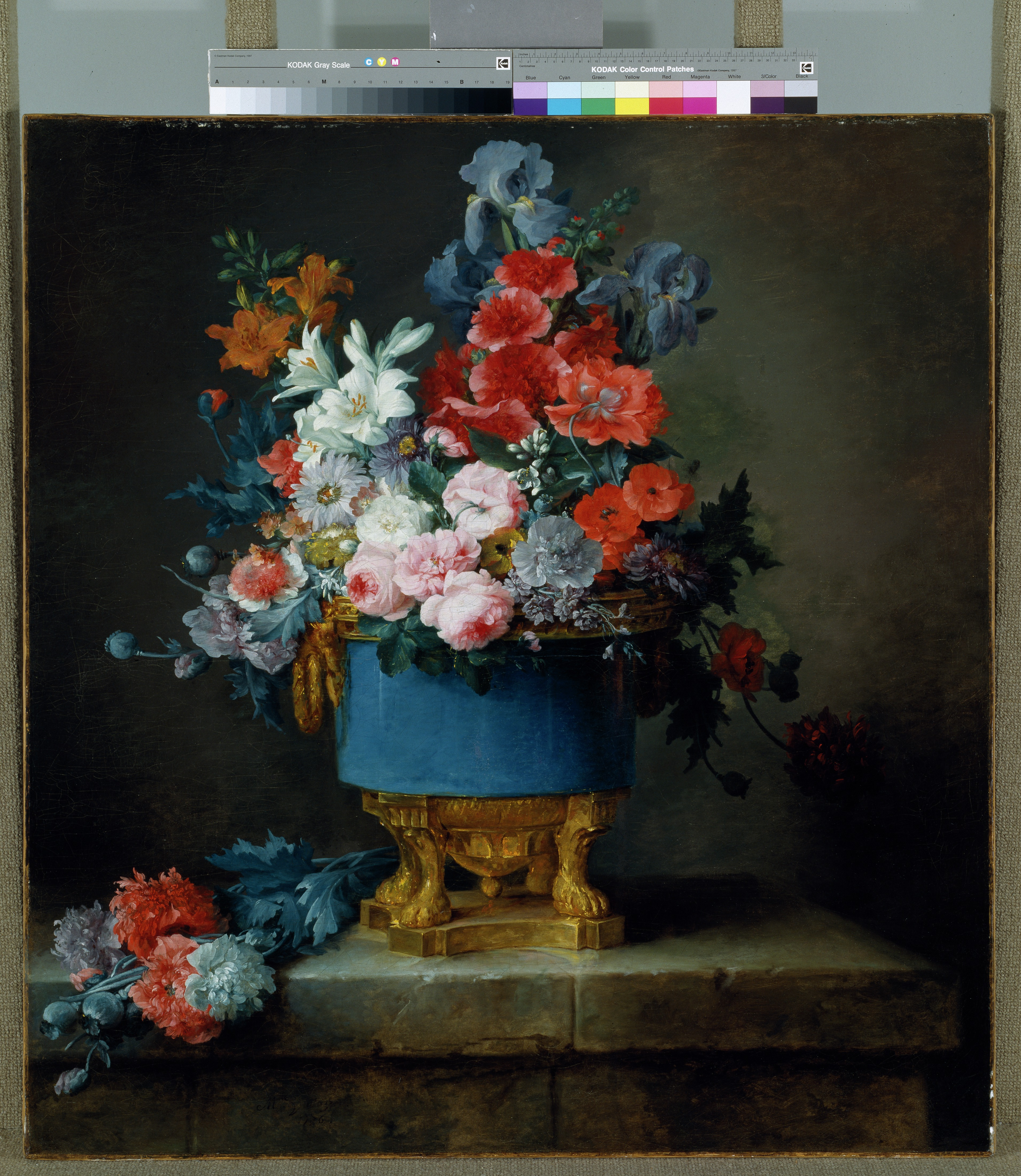
Bouquet of Flowers in a Blue Porcelain Vase by Anne Vallayer-Coster

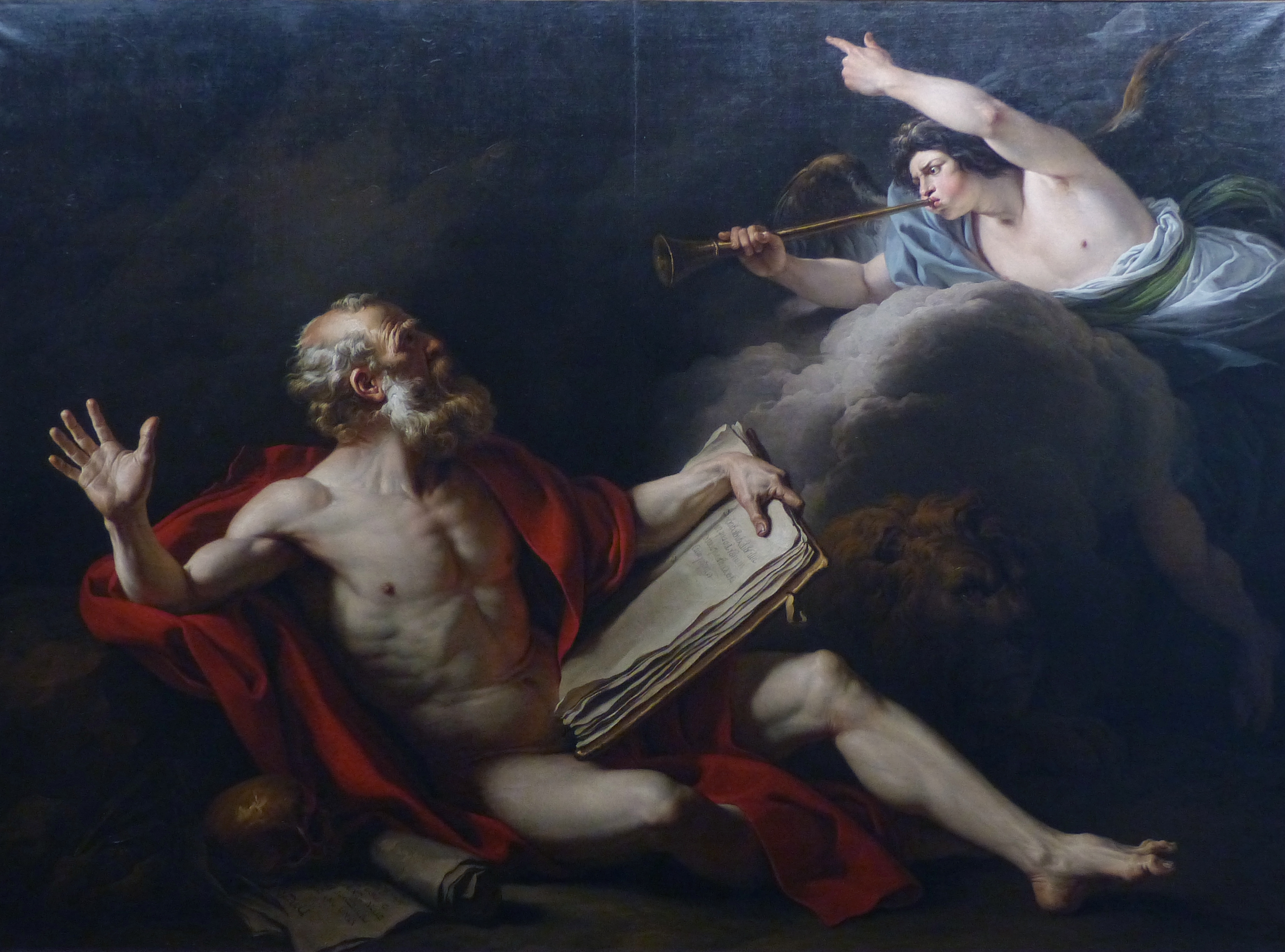
Saint Jerome in the Desert by François-André Vincent

The Broken Marriage by Etienne Aubry

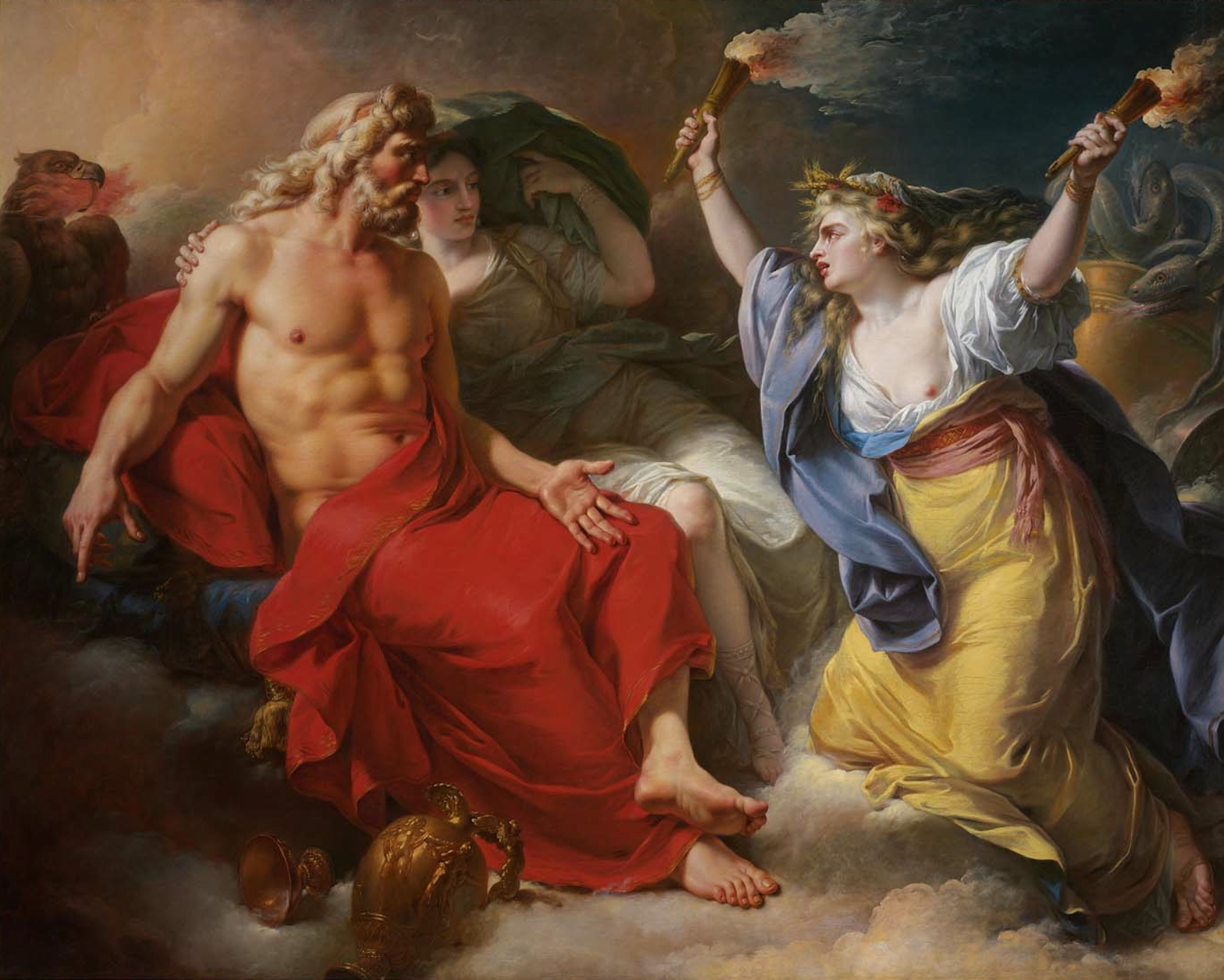
Jupiter and Ceres by Antoine-François Callet

Fabricius, Accompanied by His Family, Refuses the Gifts of Pyrrhus by Louis-Jean-François Lagrenée

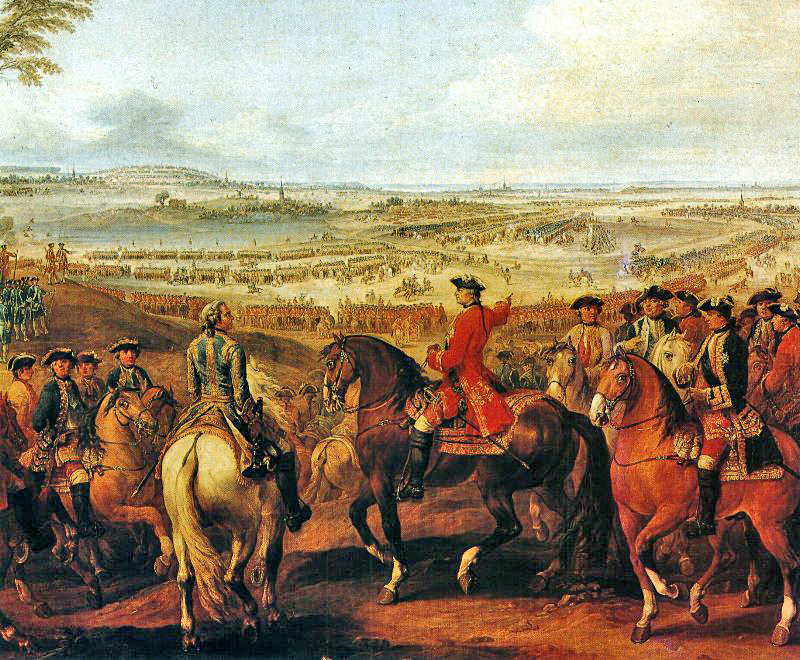
The Battle of Lauffeld by Pierre L'Enfant

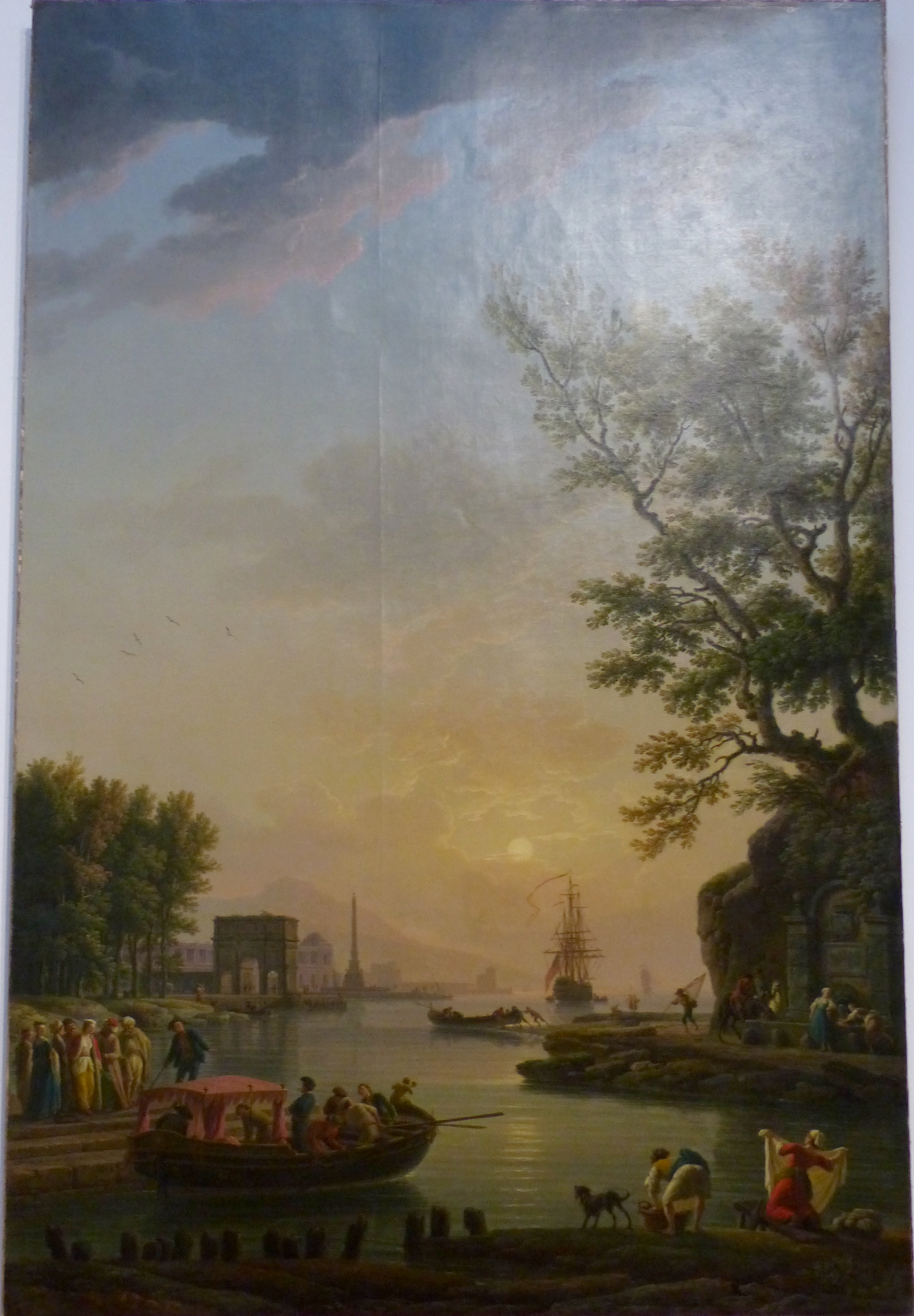
Entrance to a Seaport by Claude-Joseph Vernet

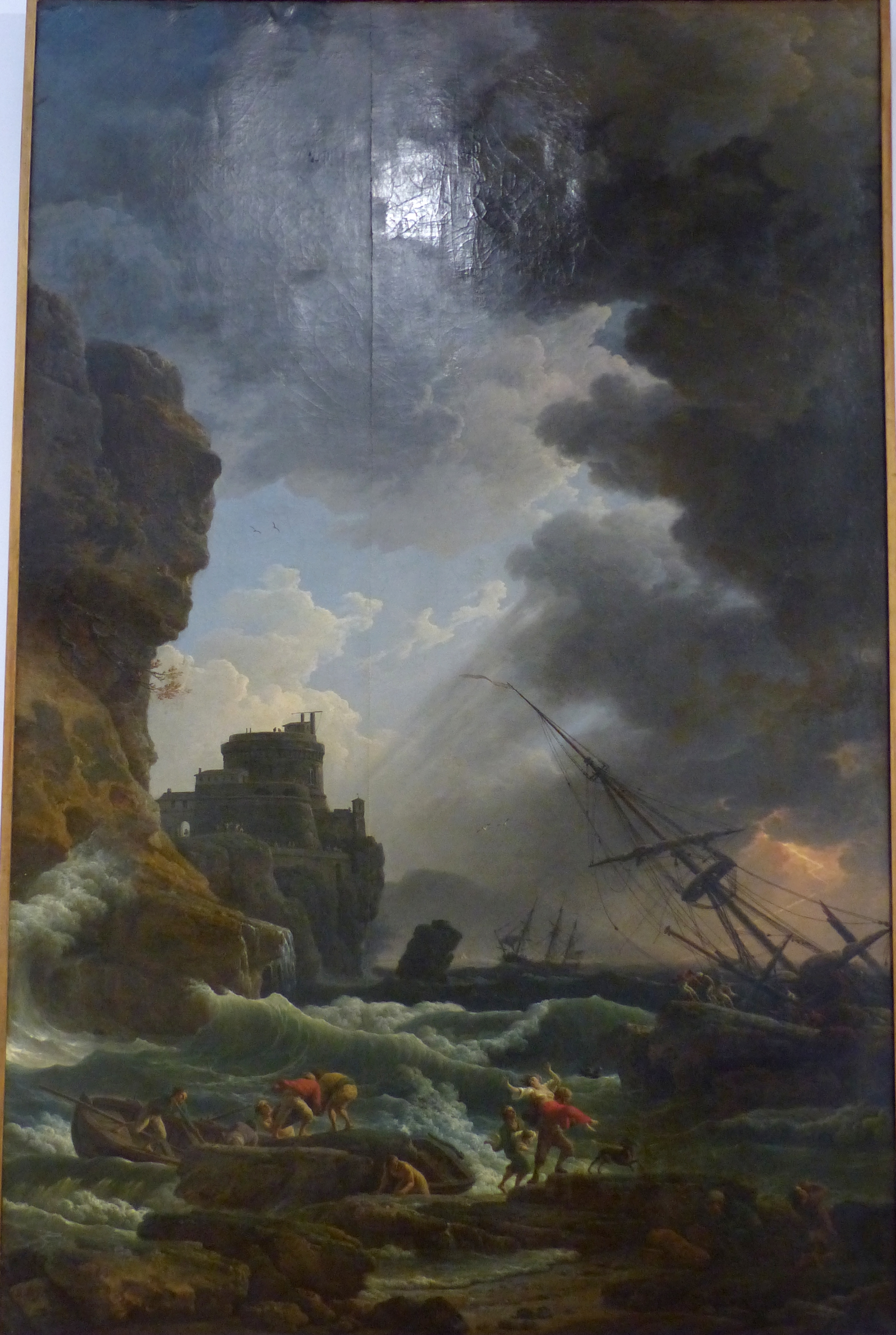
Storm with a Shipwreck by Claude-Joseph Vernet

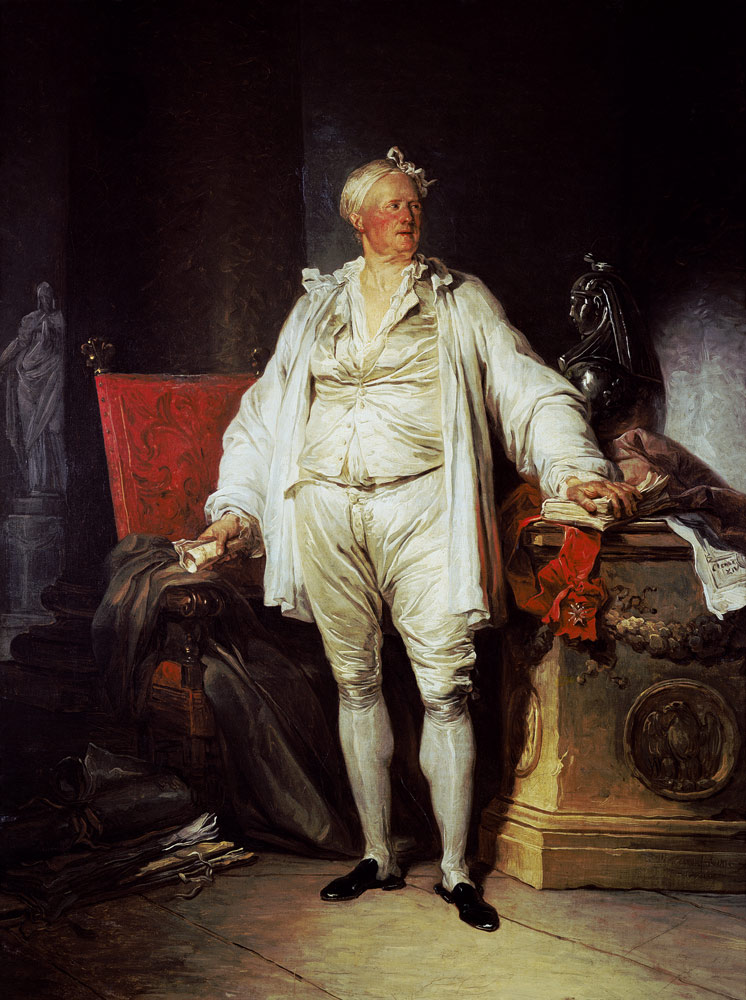
Portrait of Bergeret de Grancourt by François-André Vincent

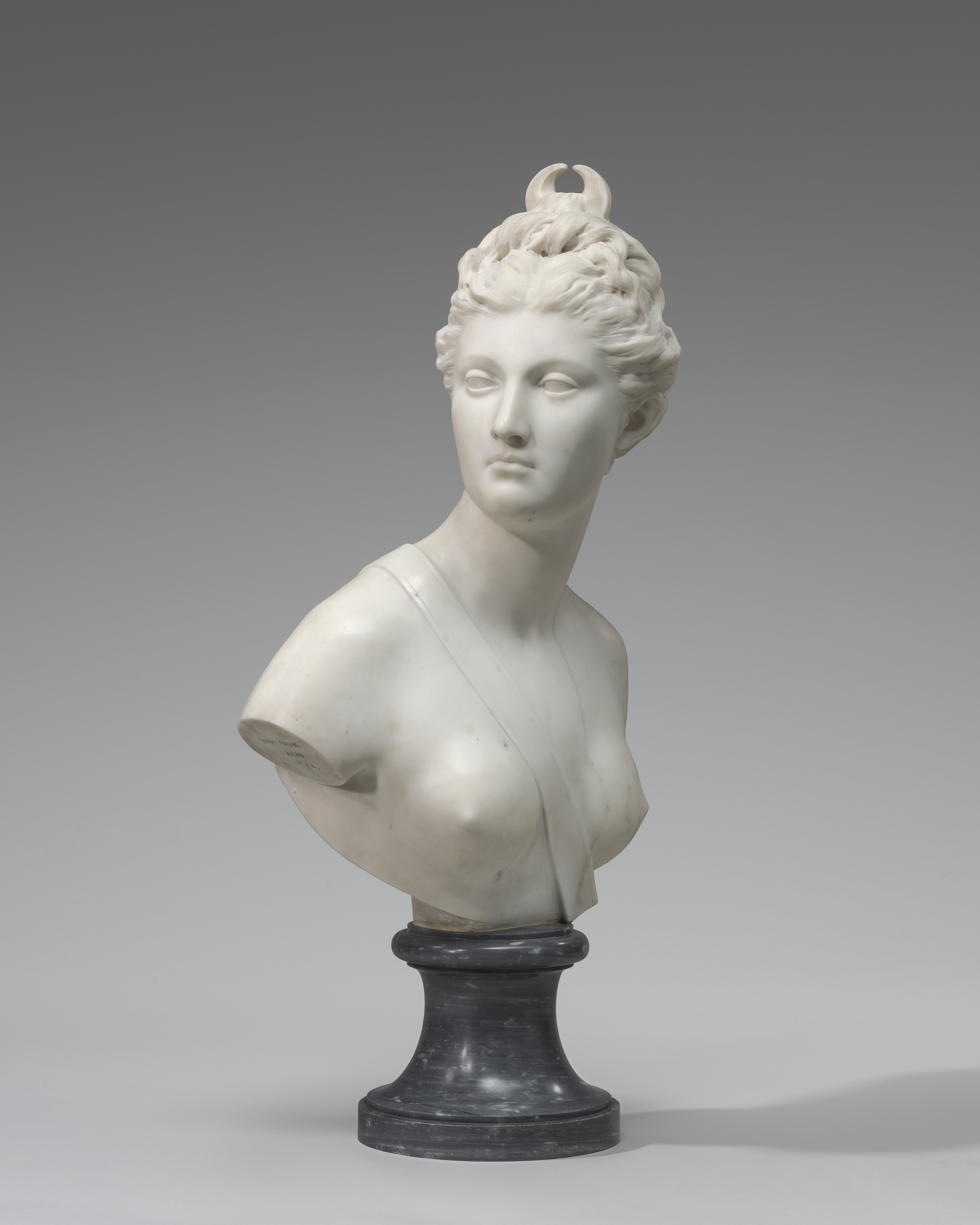
Diana by Jean-Antoine Houdon

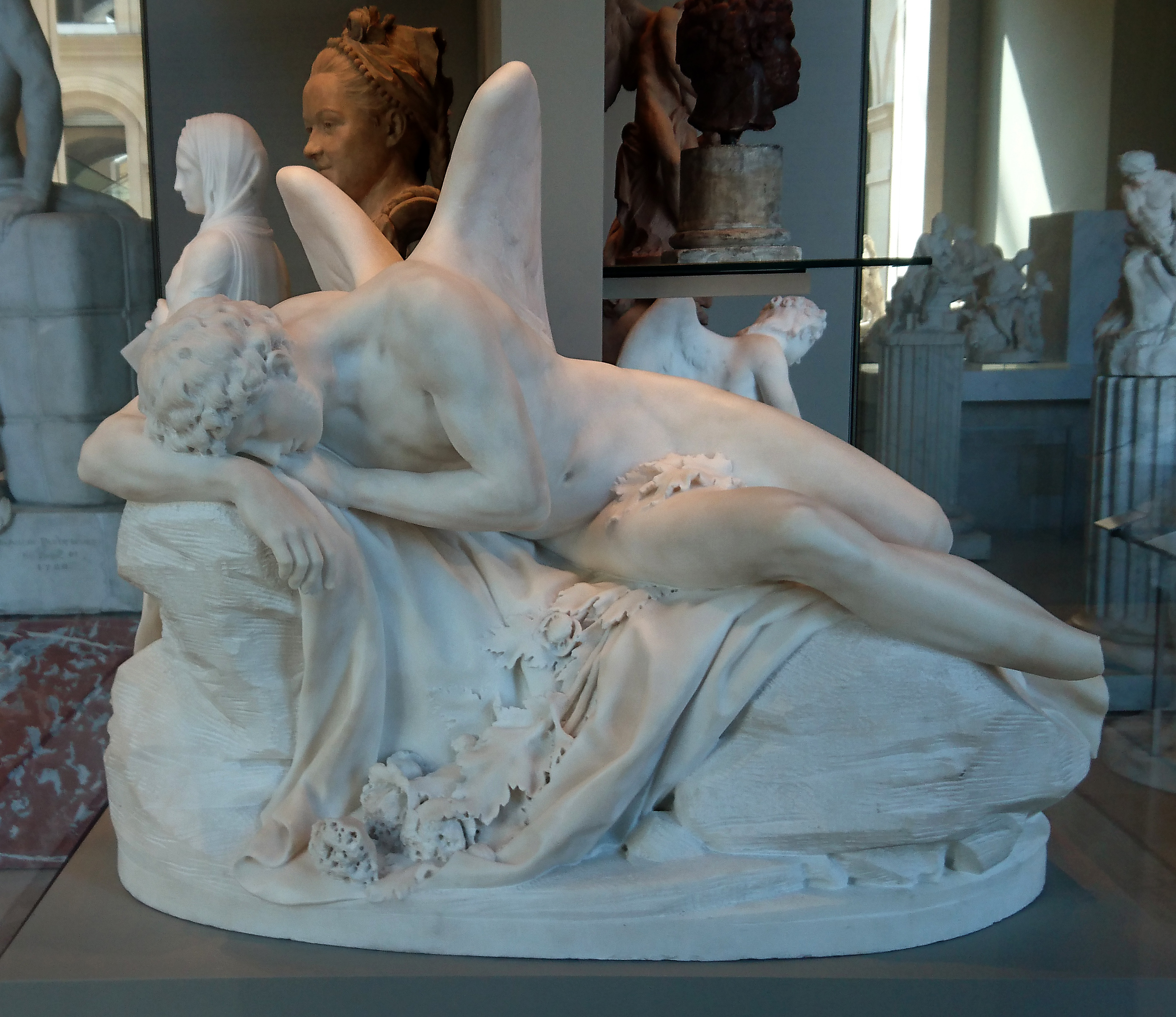
Morphée by Jean-Antoine Houdon

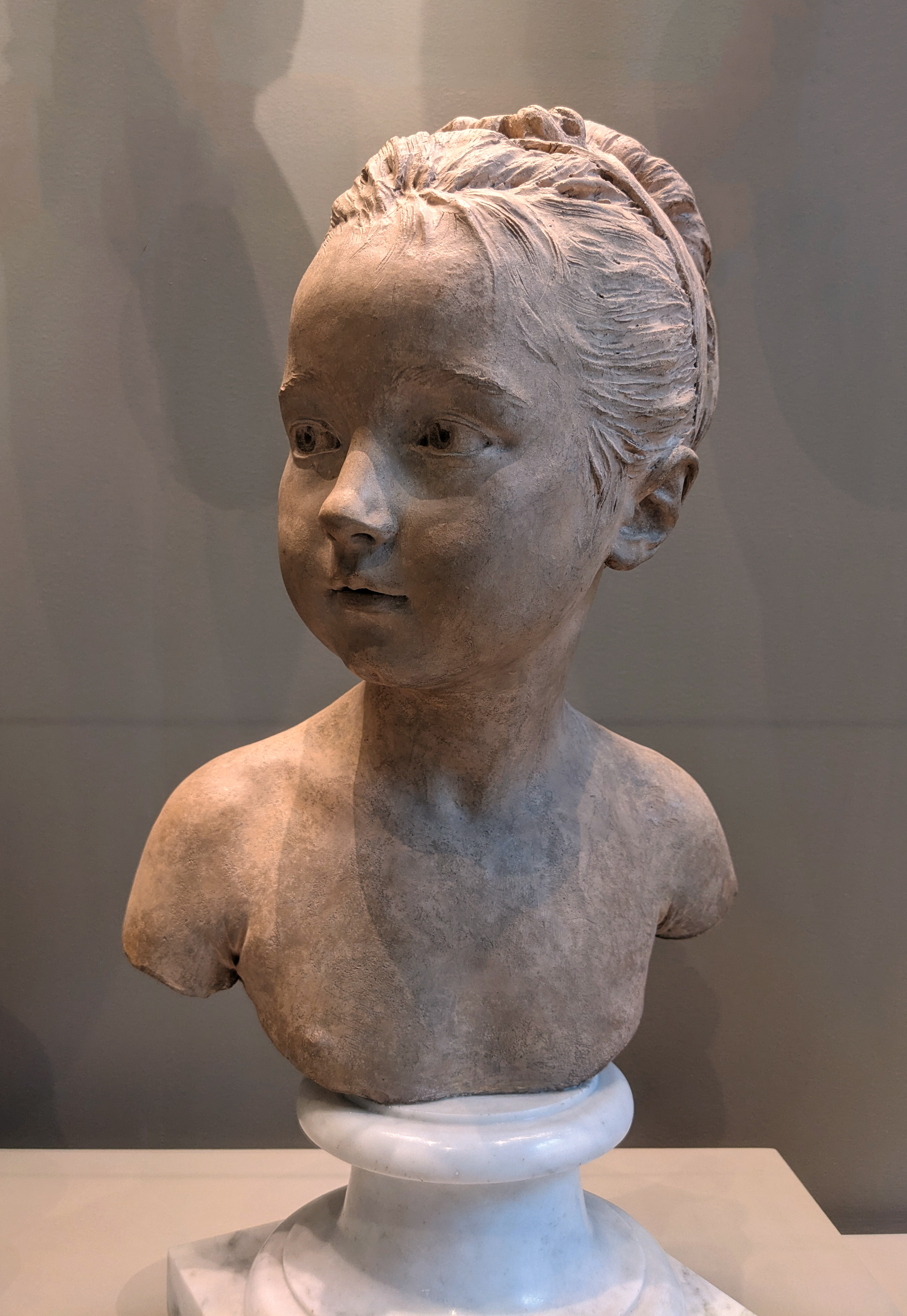
Louise Brongniart by Jean-Antoine Houdon

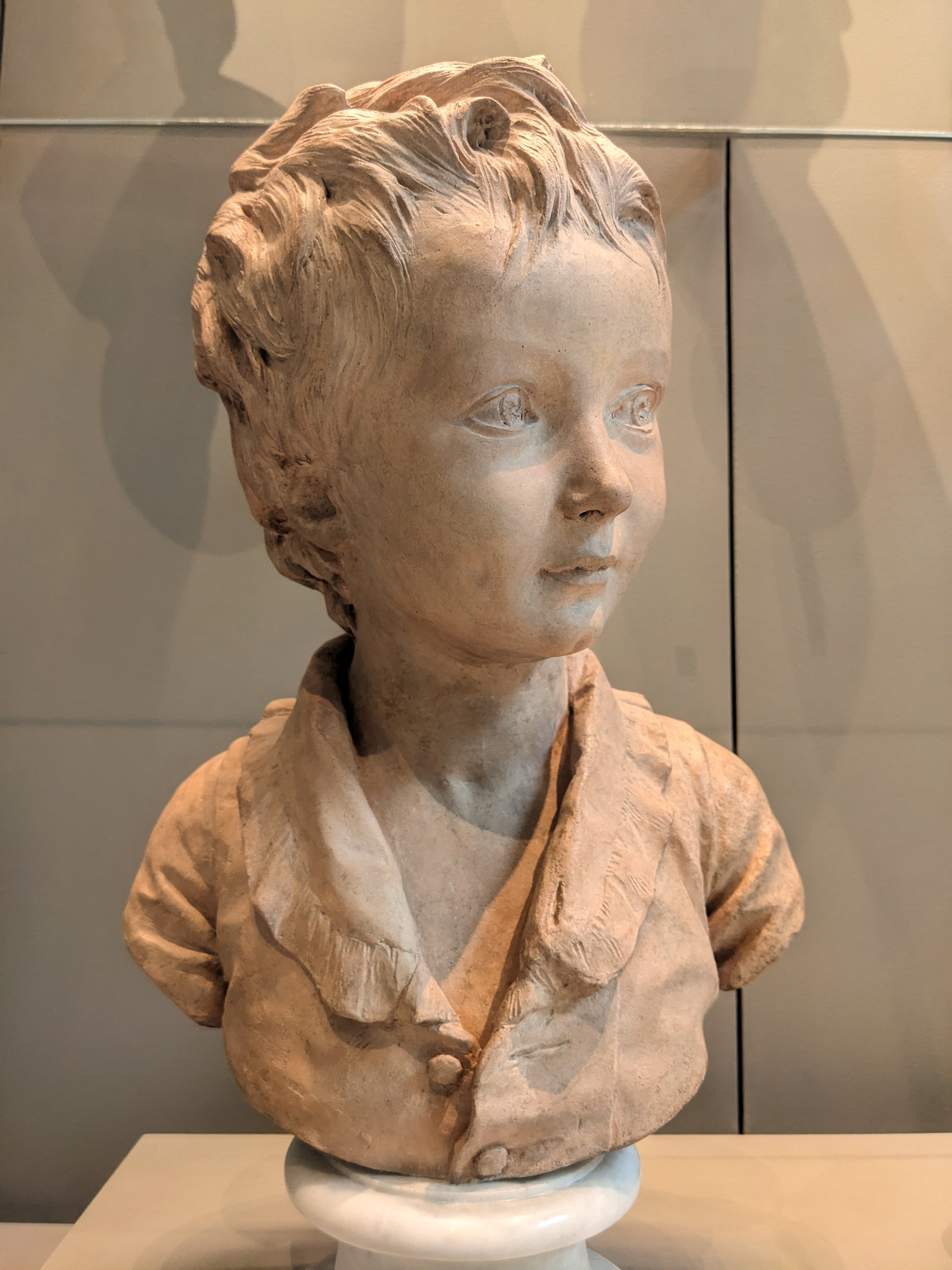
Alexandre Brongniart by Jean-Antoine Houdon

== See also ==
- Royal Academy Exhibition of 1777, held in London

== Bibliography ==
- Baetjer, Katharine. French Paintings in The Metropolitan Museum of Art from the Early Eighteenth Century through the Revolution. Metropolitan Museum of Art, 2019.
- Bermingham, Ann & Brewer, John (ed.)Consumption Of Culture, 1600-1800. Taylor & Francis, 2013.
- Born, Deborah Lee. The Life and Works of Hubert Robert. University of California Press, 1977.
- Chastel, André. French Art: The Ancien Régime, 1620-1775. Flammarion, 1994.
- Hanning, Barbara Russano ·Studies in Music, Words, and Imagery in Early Modern Europe. Taylor & Francis, 2024.
- Levey, Michael. Painting and Sculpture in France, 1700-1789. Yale University Press, 1993.
- Poulet, Anne L. Jean-Antoine Houdon: Sculptor of the Enlightenment. University of Chicago Press, 2003.
- Williams, Hannah. Académie Royale: A History in Portraits. Taylor & Francis, 2017.
