= Portrait of Bergeret de Grancourt =

Painting by François-André Vincent

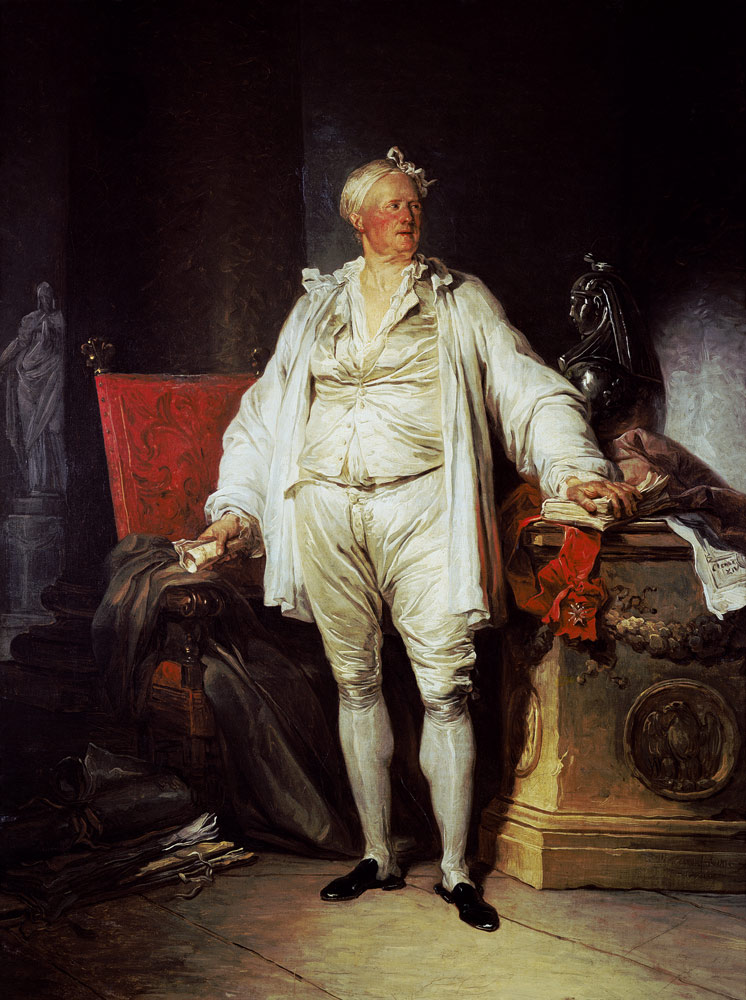
- Artist: François-André Vincent
- Year: 1774
- Type: Oil on canvas, portrait painting
- Dimensions: 61.5 cm × 47.5 cm (24.2 in × 18.7 in)
- Location: Museum of Fine Arts, Besançon

Portrait of Bergeret de Grancourt is an oil on canvas portrait painting by the French artist François-André Vincent, from 1774. It is held at the Museum of Fine Arts, in Besançon.

== History and description ==
It depicts the art collector and public official Pierre Jacques Onésyme Bergeret de Grancourt. Having been awarded the Prix de Rome in 1768 Vincent had spent several years in residence in the city. Bergeret de Grancour was a government official of the French ancien regime, who had arrived in Rome in the company of the more experienced artist Jean-Honoré Fragonard who his became.

The composition provides a playful contrast to the usual Grand Tour portraits produced by artists such as Pompeo Batoni. While it is conventional in showing him surrounded by the various objects be had acquired on his journey, they are shown scattered untidily while he himself is shown in his night clothes. He is also shown holding a letter from Pope Clement XIV giving access to the Papacy's collection. It is highly likely that the sitter was in on the joke and the picture was a play on the conventions of such portraits rather than at his expense.

The artist also produced a portrait of Bergeret de Grancourt's dog Diane. Vincent displayed both paintings at the Salon of 1777 held at the Louvre, in Paris. Today the portrait of Bergeret de Grancourt is part of the collection of the Museum of Fine Arts, in Besançon, which has held it since 1843.

== Bibliography ==
- Mansfield, Elizabeth C. The Perfect Foil: François-André Vincent and the Revolution in French Painting. University of Minnesota Press, 2011.
- Pohl-Resl,Brigitte & Kalof, Linda (ed.) A Cultural History of Animals: In the Age of Enlightenment. Berg, 2007.
