= Montmerle Charterhouse =

Carthusian monastery in Lescheroux, France

Coordinates: 46°23′34″N 5°7′34″E

Montmerle Charterhouse (French: Chartreuse Notre-Dame de Montmerle du Val-Saint-Étienne, Latin: Mons Merula) is a former charterhouse, or Carthusian monastery, located in Lescheroux, in the arrondissement of Bourg-en-Bresse and the canton of Saint-Trivier-de-Courtes, in the department of Ain, France.

== History ==
=== Benedictines ===
The first monastery established here was a Benedictine priory, founded in 1070 by Hugh d'Asnières des Bois. It was subordinate to Seillon Priory, and both were later subordinate to Joug-Dieu Abbey.

Hugh of Colemi (Hugo Coloniacum) in the Kingdom of Jerusalem granted lands to found a grange here exempt from feudal duties, in 1202.

=== Carthusians ===
Like Seillon, Montmerle became a Carthusian community in 1210, following a bull issued by Pope Innocent III, the 36th Carthusian foundation.

Montmerle Charterhouse was dissolved in 1792 during the French Revolution, when some of its paintings, including a number by Nicolas-Guy Brenet, were moved to the parish church of Pont-de-Vaux.

== Present day ==
The monastery is in ruins, except for the main entrance and the mill.

== Sources ==
- Genton, André, nd: Montmerle: la chartreuse oubliée.
- Schwengel, Georg, nd (published 1981): Propago sacri Ordinis cartusiensis [per Franciam]; [pars 2:] de provinciis Burgundiæ, Franciæ, Picardiæ, Teutoniæ, et Angliæ [British Library London additional manuscript 17085, published in] Analecta cartusiana, No 90.2. Salzburg: Institut für Anglistik und Amerikanistik (in German and Latin)
- Watercolour of Montmerle Charterhouse, late 17th or early 18th century, possibly by Louis Boudan (in French)
- Gallica BNF: Same image, larger
