= Belisarius (painting) =

Painting by François-André Vincent

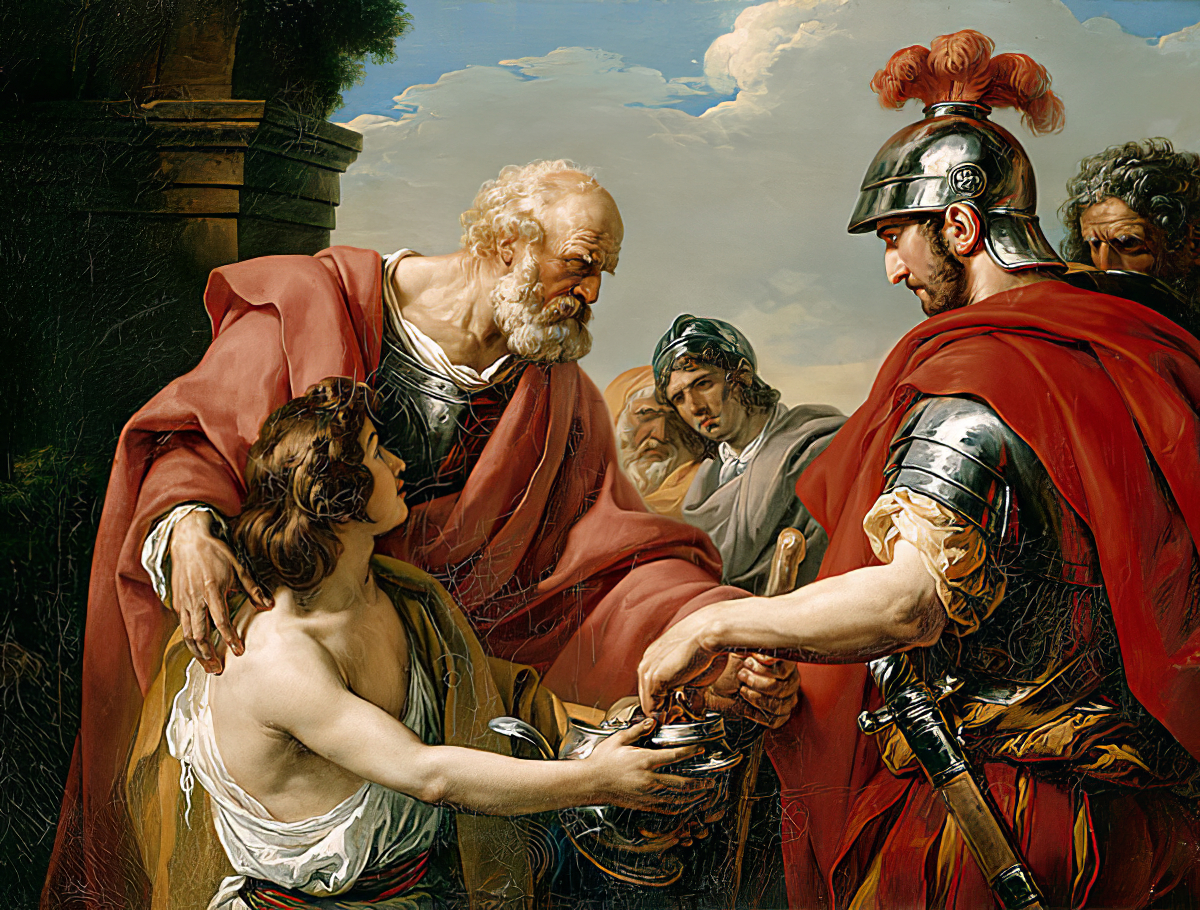
- Artist: François-André Vincent
- Year: 1776
- Type: Oil on canvas, history painting
- Dimensions: 98 cm × 129 cm (39 in × 51 in)
- Location: Musée Fabre, Montpellier

Belisarius (French: Bélisaire) is an oil on canvas history painting by the French artist François-André Vincent, from 1776.

It depicts a scene from the Byzantine Empire in which Belisarius is given aid by a passing officer. The artist drew inspiration from the 1767 novel Bélisaire by Jean-François Marmontel. It was one of fifteen works that Vincent displayed at the Salon of 1777 at the Louvre and was hung as a pendant to Alcibiades Being Taught by Socrates. Today it is part of the collection of the Musée Fabre ,in Montpellier which acquired it in 1937.

== Bibliography ==
- Crow, Thomas E. Painters and Public Life in Eighteenth-century Paris. Yale University Press, 1985.
- Mansfield, Elizabeth C. The Perfect Foil: François-André Vincent and the Revolution in French Painting. University of Minnesota Press, 2011.
- Zutter, Jörg, Hilaire, Michel & Zeder, Olivier (ed.) French Paintings from the Musée Fabre, Montpellier. National Gallery of Australia, 2003.
