= Alcibiades Being Taught by Socrates =

1777 painting by François-André Vincent

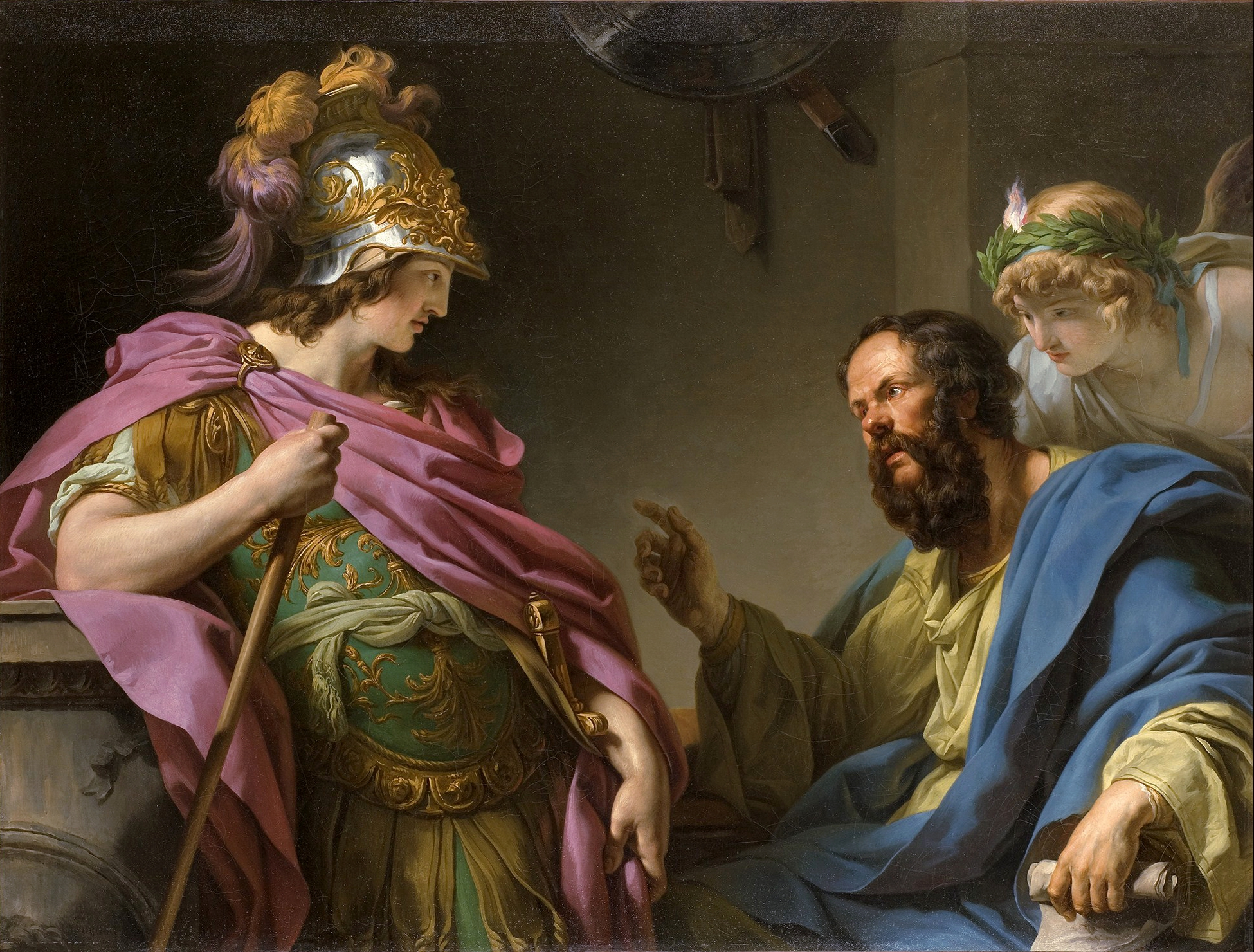
- Artist: François-André Vincent
- Year: 1777
- Medium: Oil on canvas
- Dimensions: 98.60 cm × 131 cm (38.82 in × 52 in)
- Location: Musée Fabre, Montpellier
- Accession: 837.1.95

Alcibiades Being Taught by Socrates (Note: French: Alcibiade recevant des leçons de Socrate Swedish: Alkibiades undervisas av Sokrates) is an oil on canvas painting by the French painter François-André Vincent, from 1777. It depicts the Athenian general Alcibiades alongside the Greek philosopher Socrates. The painting is located at the Musée Fabre in Montpellier. It was displayed at the Salon of 1777 at the Louvre with Belisarius (1776), another of Vincent's paintings. A copy of the work, made the same year as the original, is owned by Nationalmuseum in Stockholm.
