= Nicolas-Guy Brenet =

French painter (1728–1792)

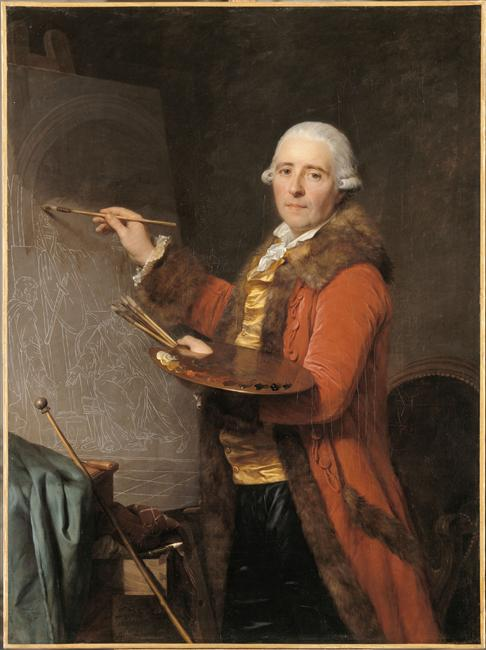
Portrait by Antoine Vestier, 1786

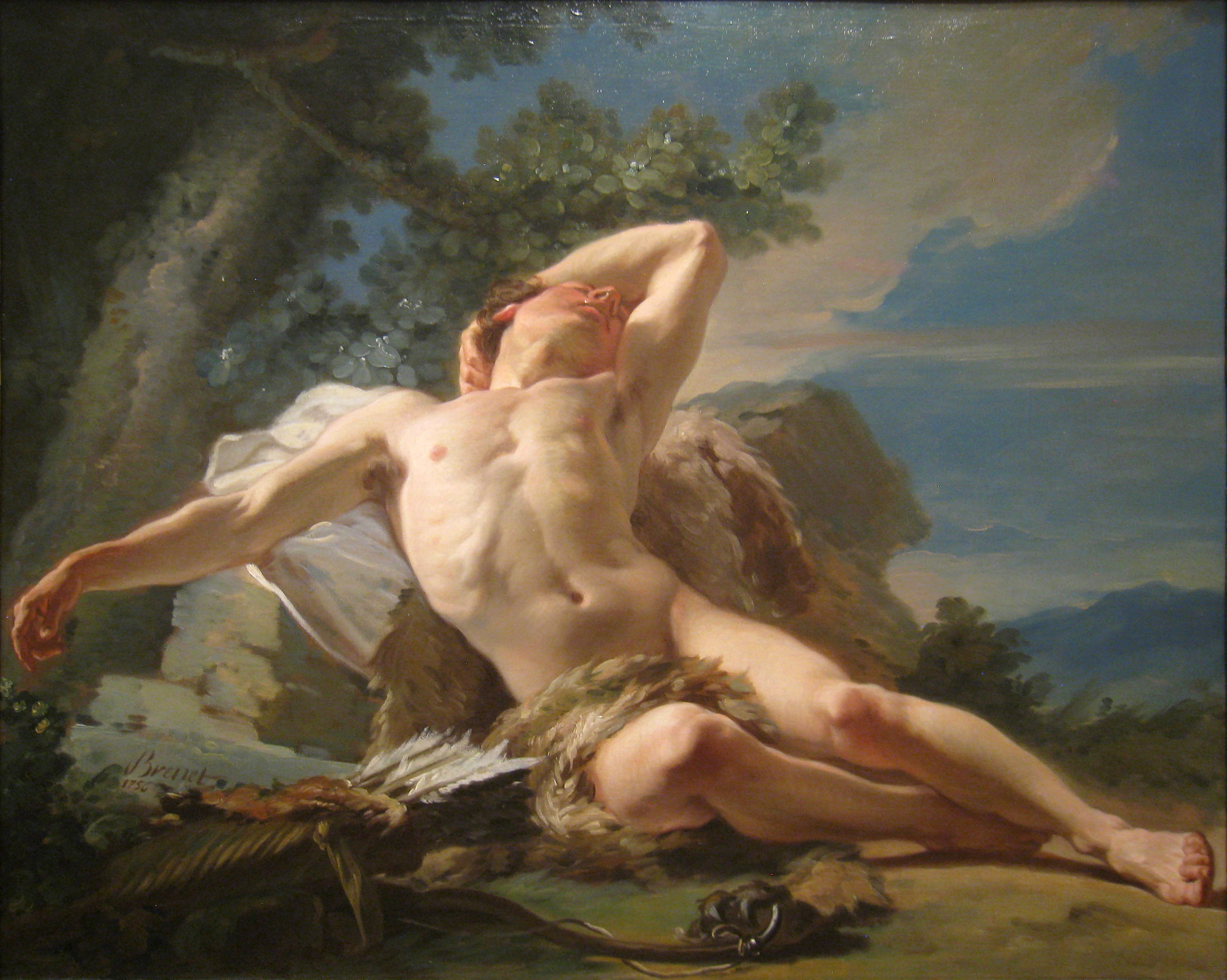
Nicolas-Guy Brenet, Sleeping Endymion, 1756. Worcester Art Museum, Massachusetts, USA

Nicolas-Guy Brenet (1 July 1728 — 21 February 1792) was a French history painter.

Brenet was born and died in Paris. He studied in the atelier of François Boucher, but abandoned his master's rococo manner in the 1760s, to paint in a conscious revival of the academic classicism of Nicolas Poussin. His cycle of religious paintings for Montmerle Charterhouse near Dijon lies securely in the mainstream of French religious painting. His enormous Battle of the Greeks and Trojans over the Body of Patroclus is an example of the new direction of official art in France. In his unusual and precocious choice of medieval subjects, as they were commissioned by the official Bâtiments du roi, his work foreshadowed the style troubadour of the 19th century.

Notable works, both now lost, are The Roman Farmer (exhibited at the Salon of 1775) and Cincinnatus Made Dictator (Salon of 1779).

He was the father of Nicolas-Guy-Antoine Brenet (1773–1846), a medallist.

== Bibliography ==
- Bailey, Colin B. The Age of Watteau, Chardin, and Fragonard: Masterpieces of French Genre Painting. Yale University Press, 2003.
