= Michel-Barthélémy Ollivier =

French painter

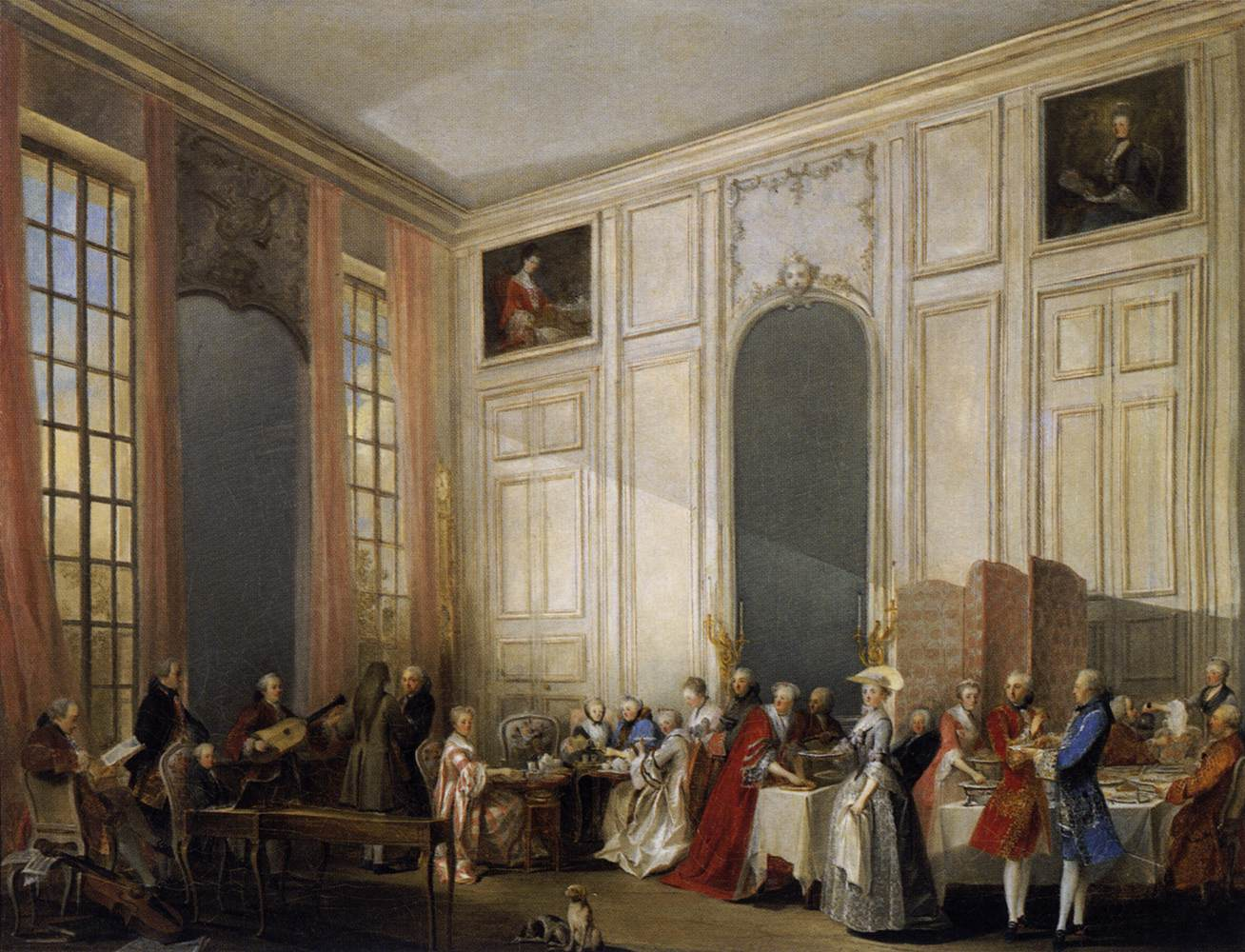
Afternoon Tea at the Maison du Temple in Paris. The young Mozart, on the Mozart family grand tour, is at the harpsichord, accompanied by Pierre Jélyotte on the baroque guitar.

Michel-Barthélémy Ollivier (24 August 1712 – 15 June 1784) was a French painter and engraver. He specialized in historical and genre scenes.

== Life and work ==
Born in Marseille, he came from a family of painters, including his father, Louis (1686–?), grandfather Antoine (1645–1716) and cousin Cosme (1651–?).

He attended the Académie de Saint-Luc and the Académie royale de peinture et de sculpture. He also studied with Charles-André van Loo. When Van Loo's nephew, Louis-Michel van Loo, was appointed a court painter to King Philip V of Spain, Ollivier accompanied him to Madrid.

He had returned to Paris by 1750, when he married Faronne-Marie-Madeleine Lefebvre, but returned to Spain with her and remained there until 1763.

He was certified as a genre painter at the Académie de Saint-Luc in 1764 and, two years later, became an "agré" (a type of candidate member) at the Académie royale. In 1772, he visited England, where he exhibited at the newly established Royal Academy in London.

Many of his works were created for Louis François, Prince of Conti, for whom he was the "peintre ordinaire" (painter-in-waiting).

He died in Paris in 1784. His works may be seen at the Musée des beaux-arts de Bordeaux, the Louvre and the Musée des beaux-arts de Valenciennes, among others. The locations of many of his works are currently unknown.
