= Nicolas Henri Jeaurat de Bertry =

French painter

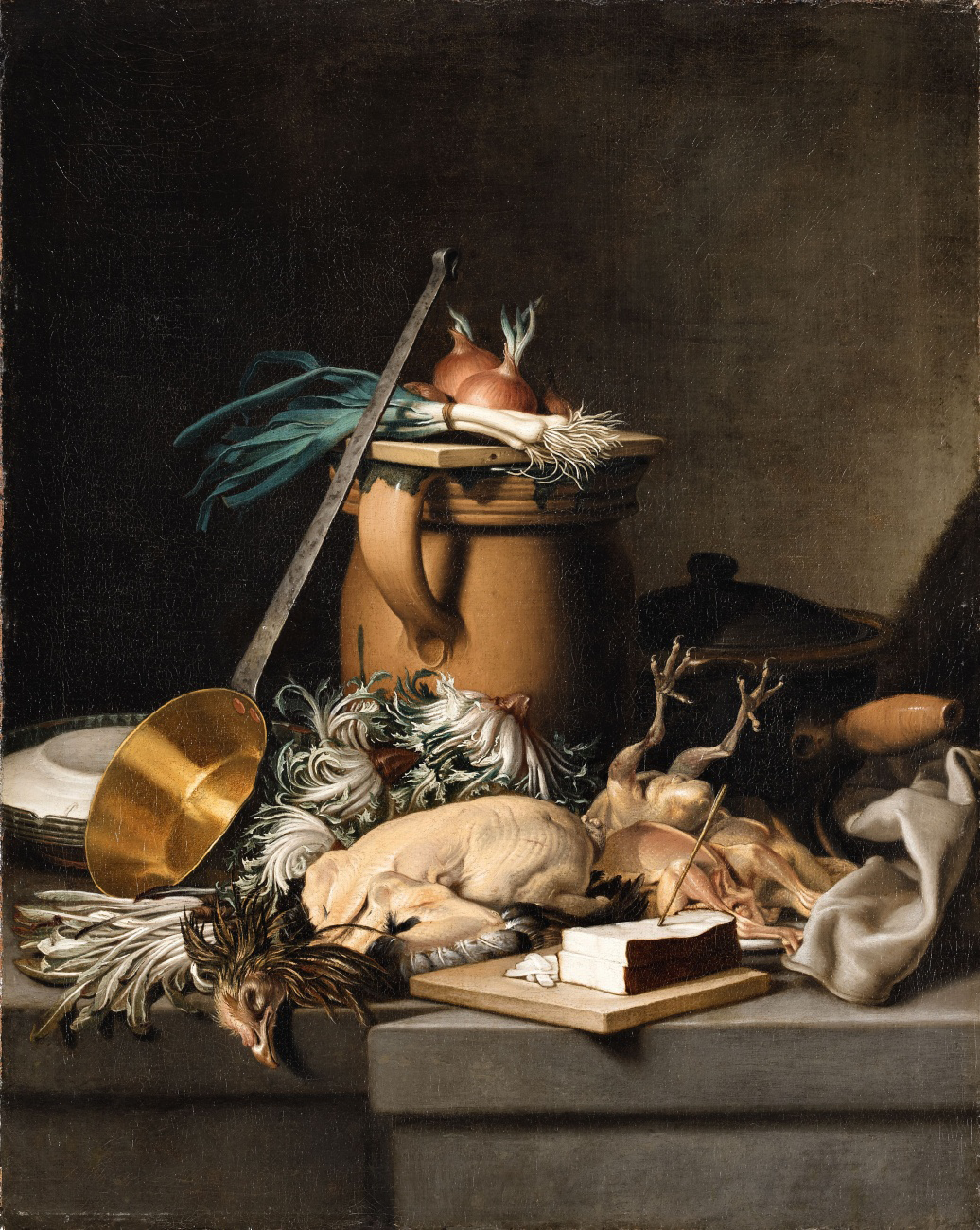
Kitchen Still-life with Poultry, Vegetables and Bread

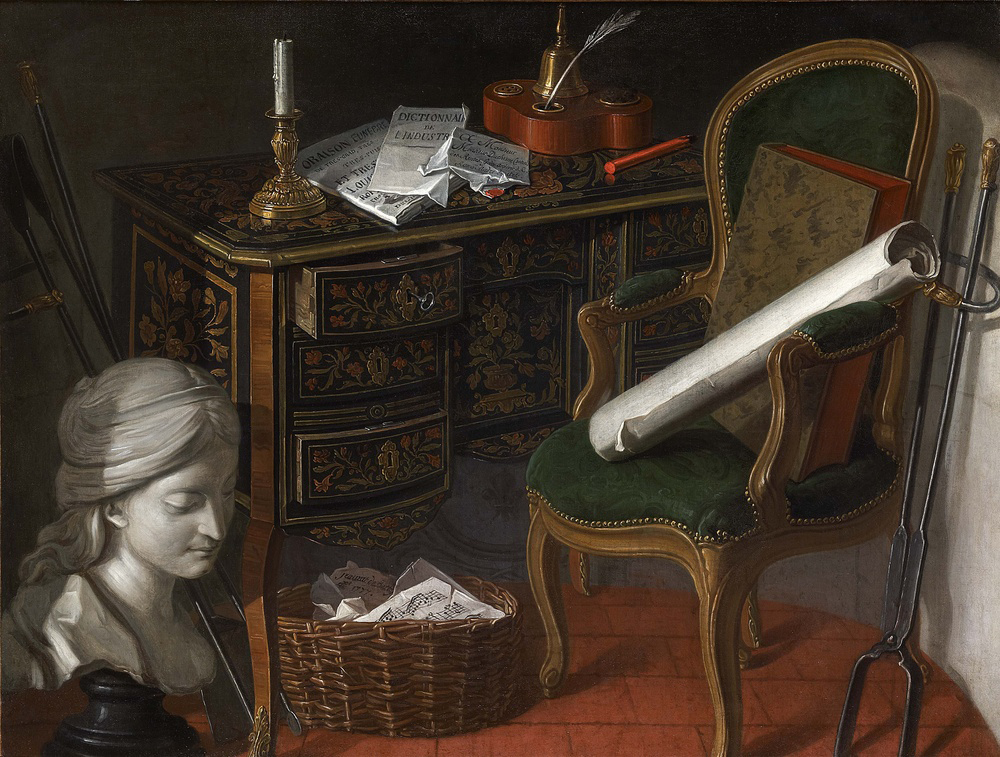
Bust of Woman by a Wicker Basket Filled with Music

Nicolas Henri Jeaurat de Bertry (28 July 1728 – after 1796) was a French painter who specialized in still-lifes. It is not clear how he acquired the name "De Bertry", although it was likely done to make him appear to be a member of the nobility.

== Biography ==
He was born in Paris. He was the son of Edme Jeaurat, engraver to the King, and studied art with his uncle, the painter Étienne Jeaurat. He established his reputation creating still-lifes, inspired by the work of Jean-Baptiste-Siméon Chardin, although some critics felt that his work was rather dry and crude by comparison. Nevertheless he was chosen, by voice vote, to be named an Academician and a professor at the Académie royale de peinture et de sculpture on the same day in 1756. His reception pieces depicted the odd contrast of cooking utensils and military trophies.

The following year, he made a presentation at the Salon that featured musical instruments as allegories of war and science. This was reviewed quite favorably by the Mercure de France. Some works from that period, previously attributed to Chardin or Henri-Horace Roland Delaporte, have since been reassigned to him.

In 1761, he was named painter and personal pensionary to Marie Leszczyńska, the Queen Consort. He left Paris to live in Versailles and remained there until the Queen's death in 1768. That same year, he was awarded a 400 Livres annual gratuity, in recognition of his services in providing amusement for her. He then returned to Paris. During the Revolution he painted mostly portraits (some with satirical intent) as well as allegories on the Tricolor, pyramids and the Masonic Eye.

In 1792, at a loss for appropriate lodgings, he requested permission to take over the rooms that had been left vacant by the death of his colleague, Nicolas Guy Brenet. This request must have been refused because, later that same year, he made a similar request for he former apartments of Gabriel-François Doyen, who had been invited to Russia. This was denied on the grounds that he had been little more than a copyist for thirty years and had not been promoted at the Académie.

The last known record of his existence was an exhibition at the Salon in 1796. After that, he apparently retired to his father's hometown, Vermenton, to live with relatives.
