= Salon of 1757 =

1757 art exhibition in Paris

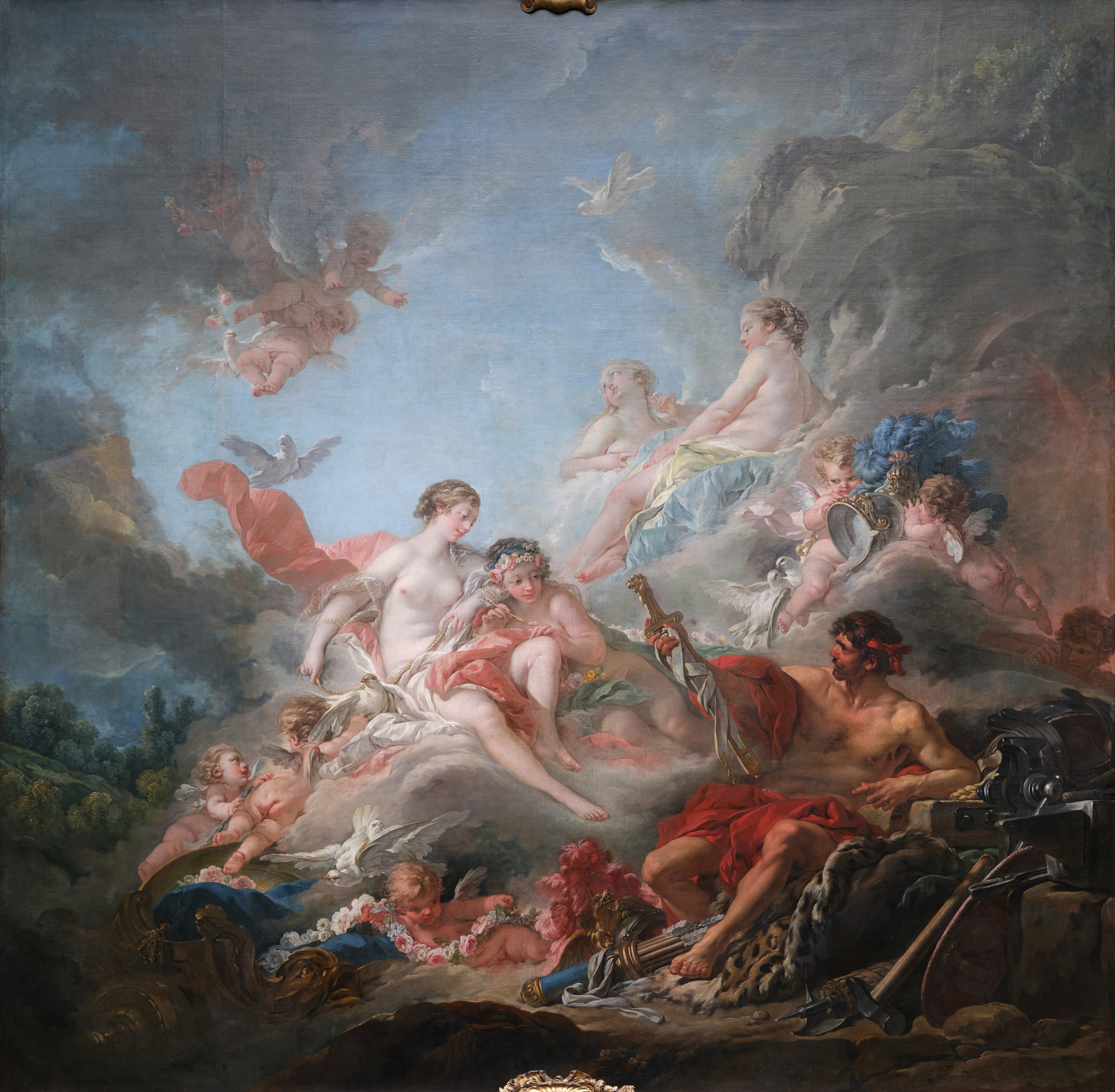
Vulcan Presenting Venus with Arms for Aeneas by François Boucher

The Salon of 1757 was an art exhibition held at the Salon Carré of the Louvre in Paris. Organised by the Académie Royale, it took place between 25 August and 25 September 1757. France was fighting the Seven Years' War against Britain and Prussia and had recently launched an Invasion of Hanover.

Pierre L'Enfant displayed The Battle of Fontenoy depicting a French victory from the previous War of the Austrian Succession. Claude-Joseph Vernet continued to exhibit paintings from his Views of the Ports of France series, a major commission from Louis XV. The sculptor Étienne Maurice Falconet enjoyed success with his statues Bather Entering Her Bath and Cupid. Jean Siméon Chardin displayed two of his characteristic still life paintings including The Kitchen Table.

François Boucher submitted his rococo Vulcan Presenting Venus with Arms for Aeneas. Jean-Baptiste Greuze had recently returned from a stay in Rome and displayed four paintings with Italianate themes. Étienne Jeaurat produced four genre paintings showing bustling life in the streets of Paris.

== Gallery ==
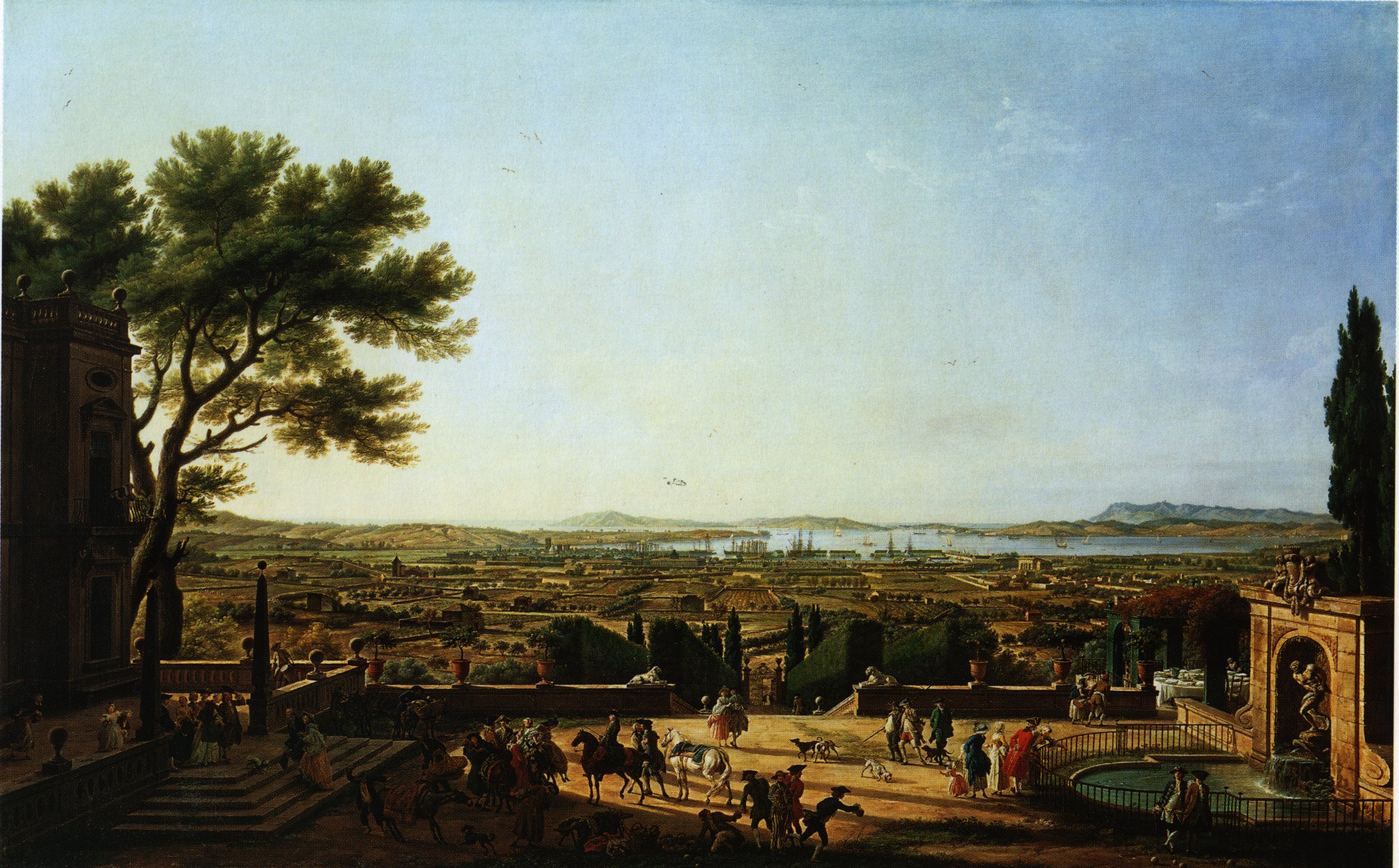
The Town and Harbour of Toulon by Claude-Joseph Vernet

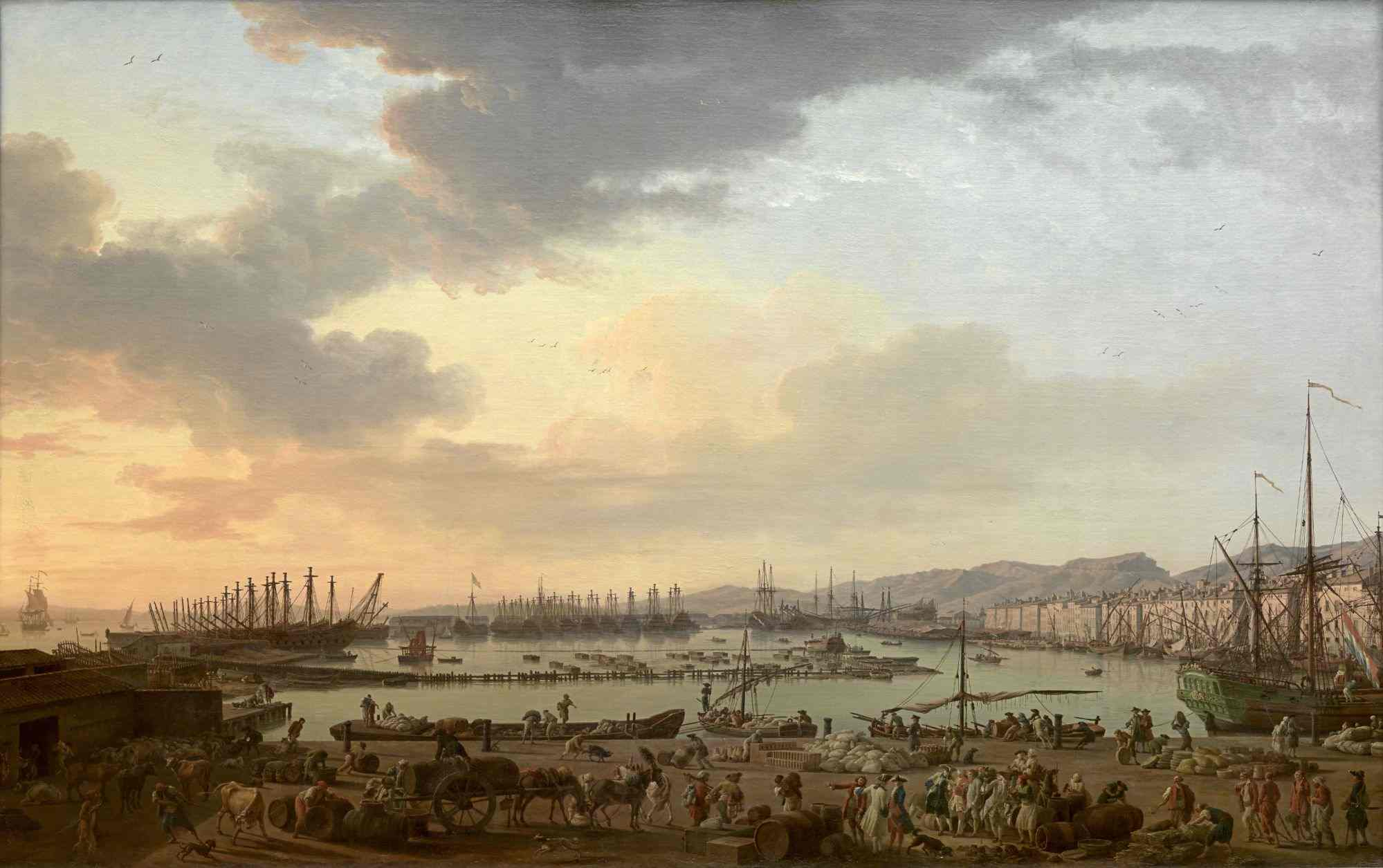
View of the Harbour of Toulon by Claude-Joseph Vernet

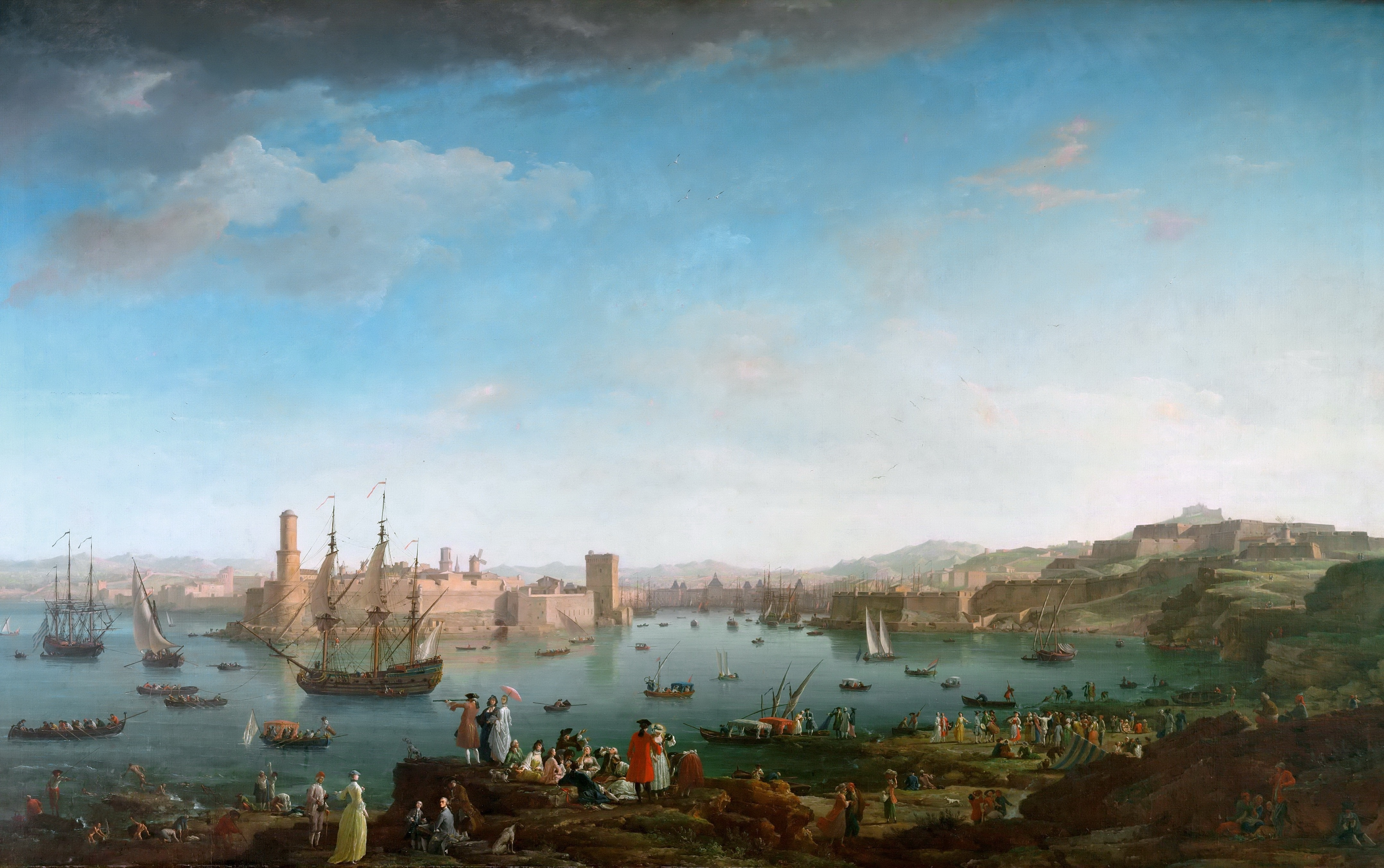
The Entrance to the Port of Marseille by Claude-Joseph Vernet

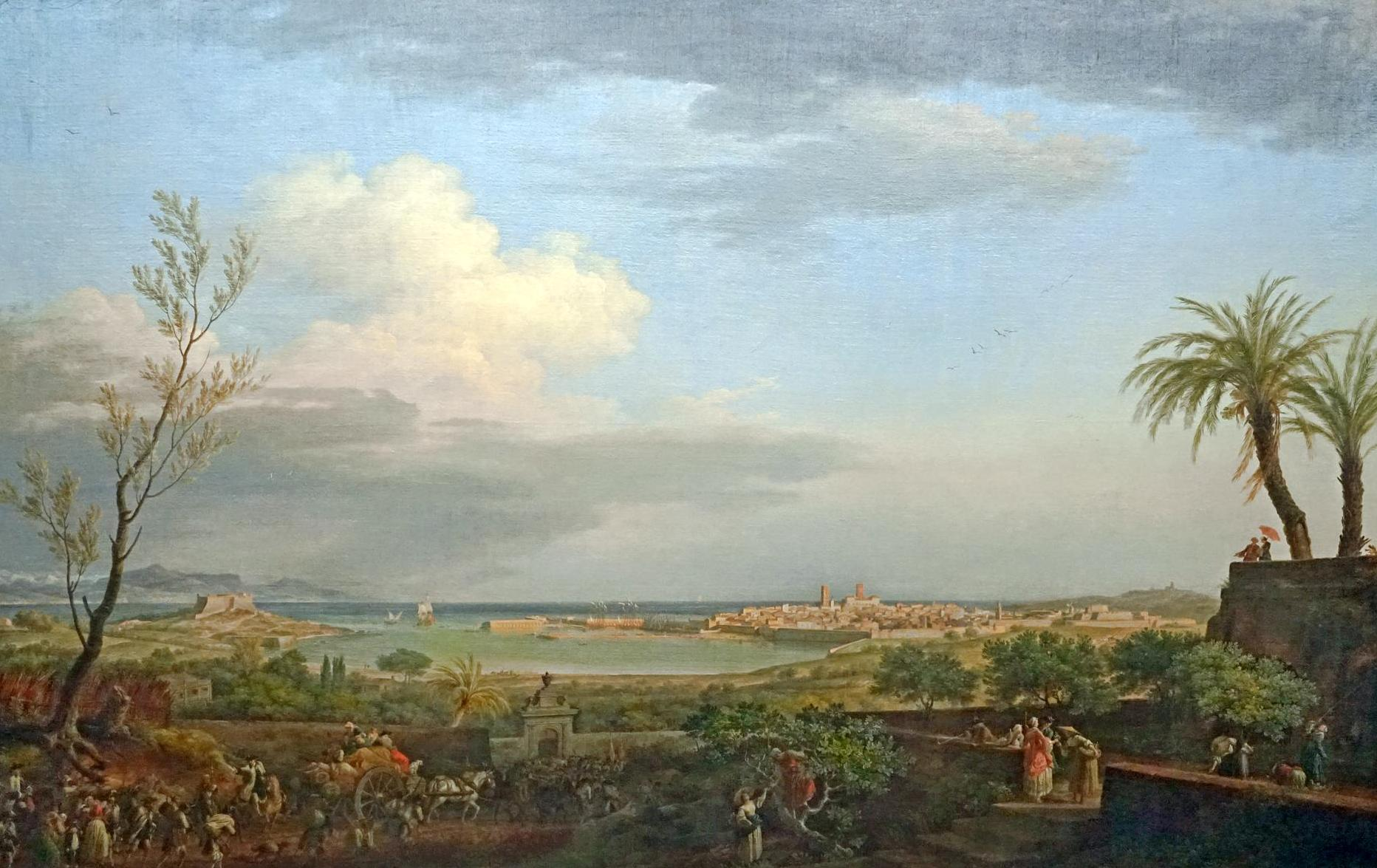
View of Antibes by Claude-Joseph Vernet

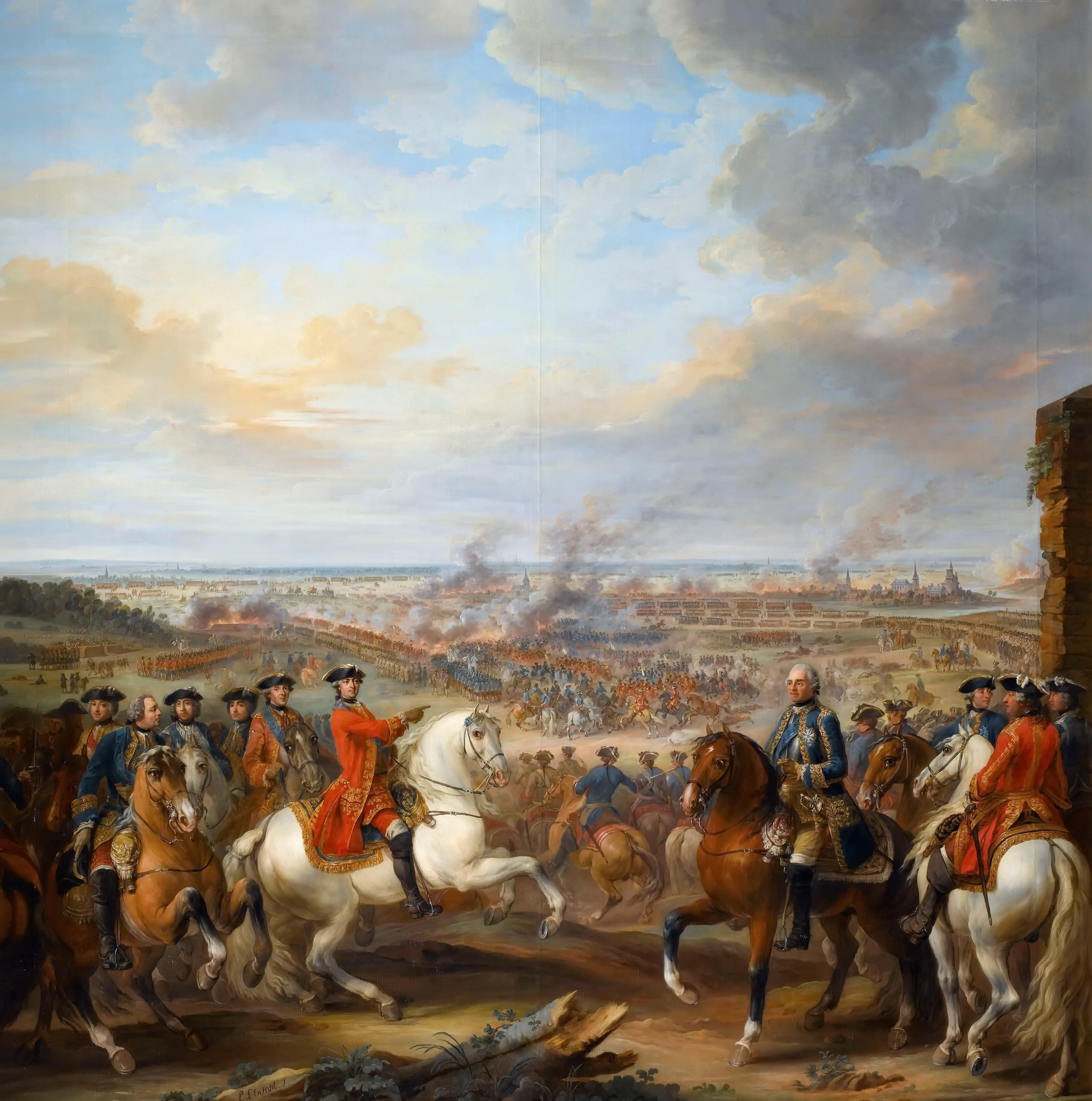
The Battle of Fontenoy by Pierre L'Enfant

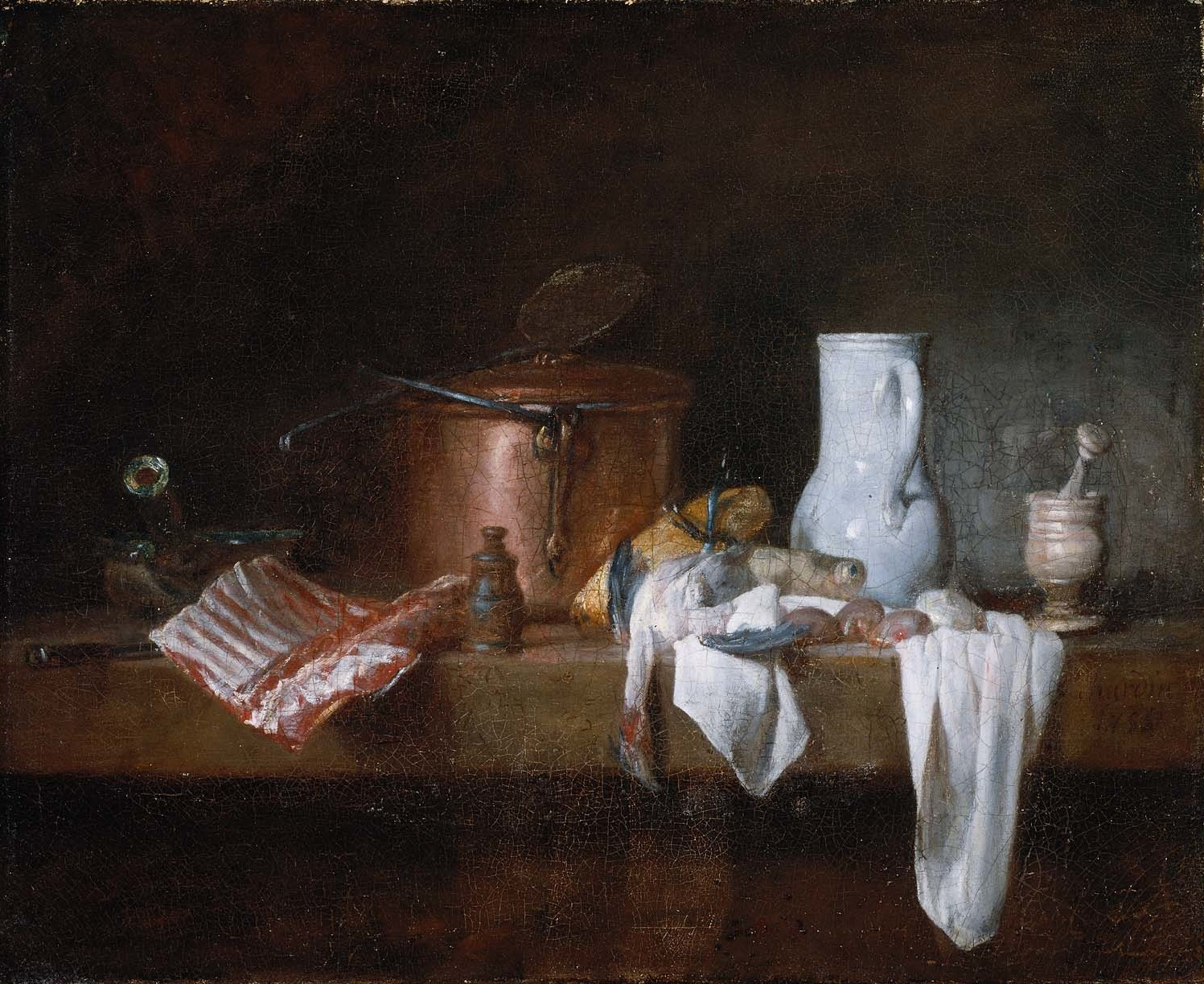
The Kitchen Table by Jean Siméon Chardin

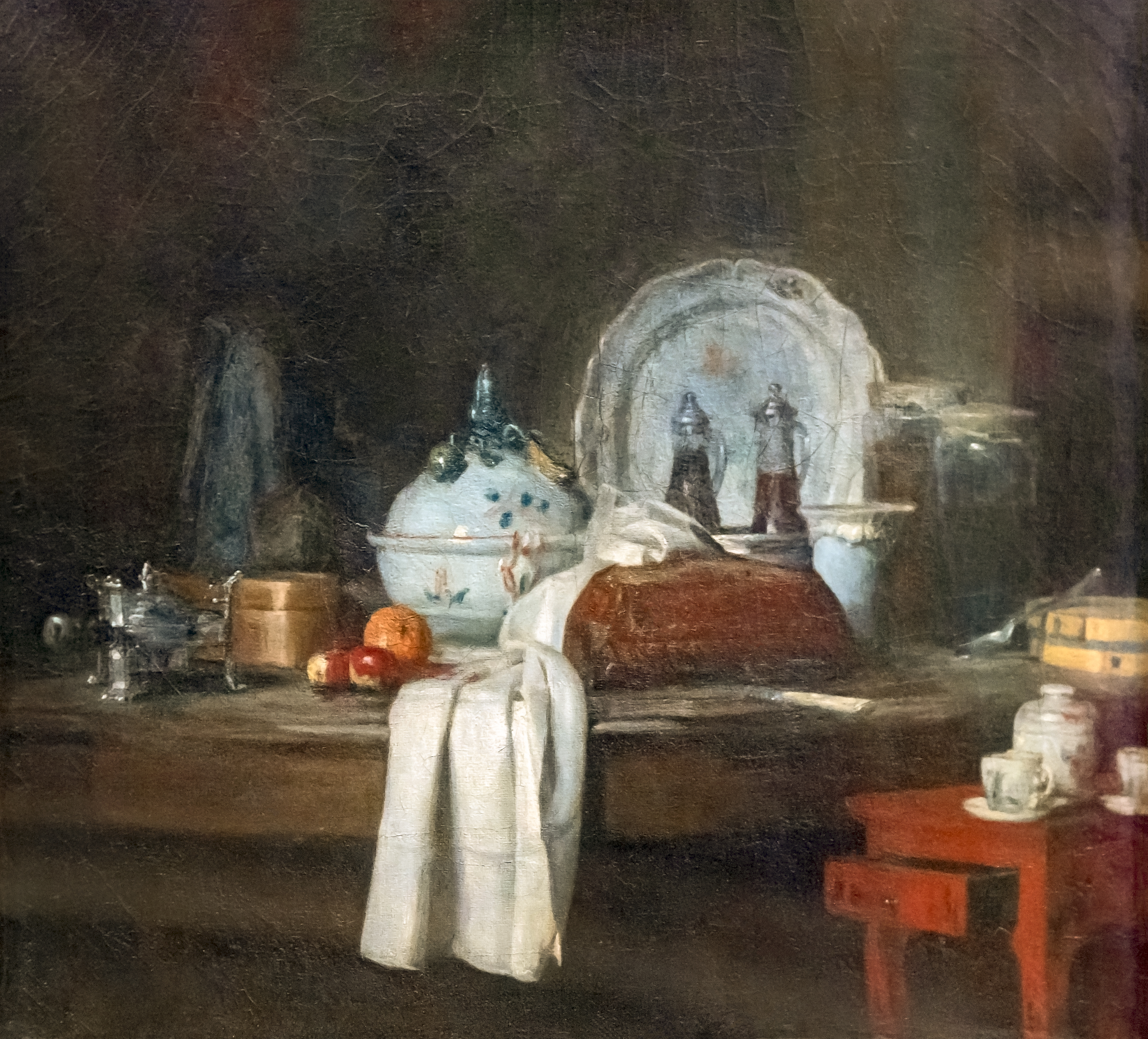
The Preparations of a Lunch by Jean Siméon Chardin

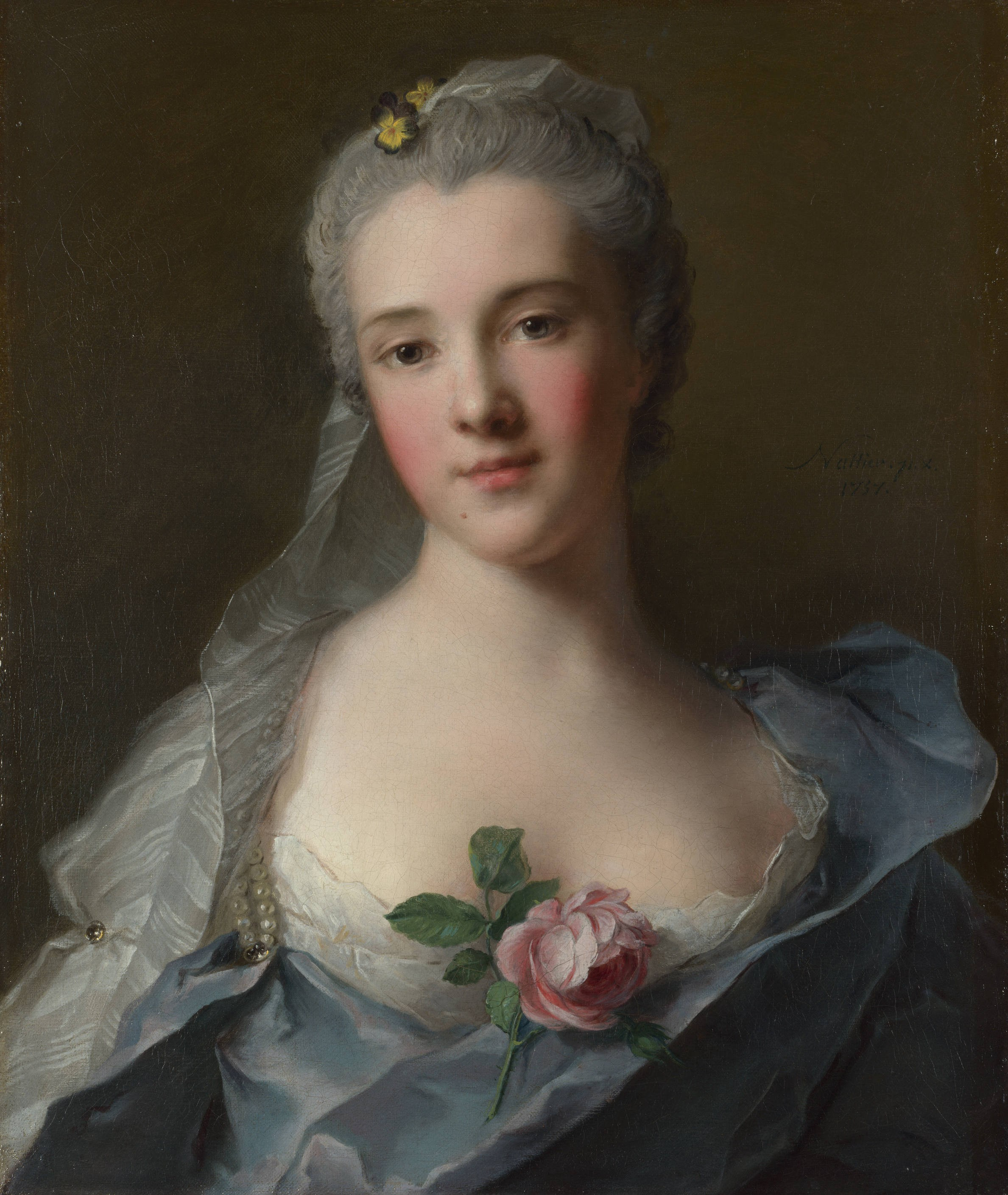
Portrait of Manon Balletti by Jean-Marc Nattier

Sweet Melancholy by Joseph-Marie Vien

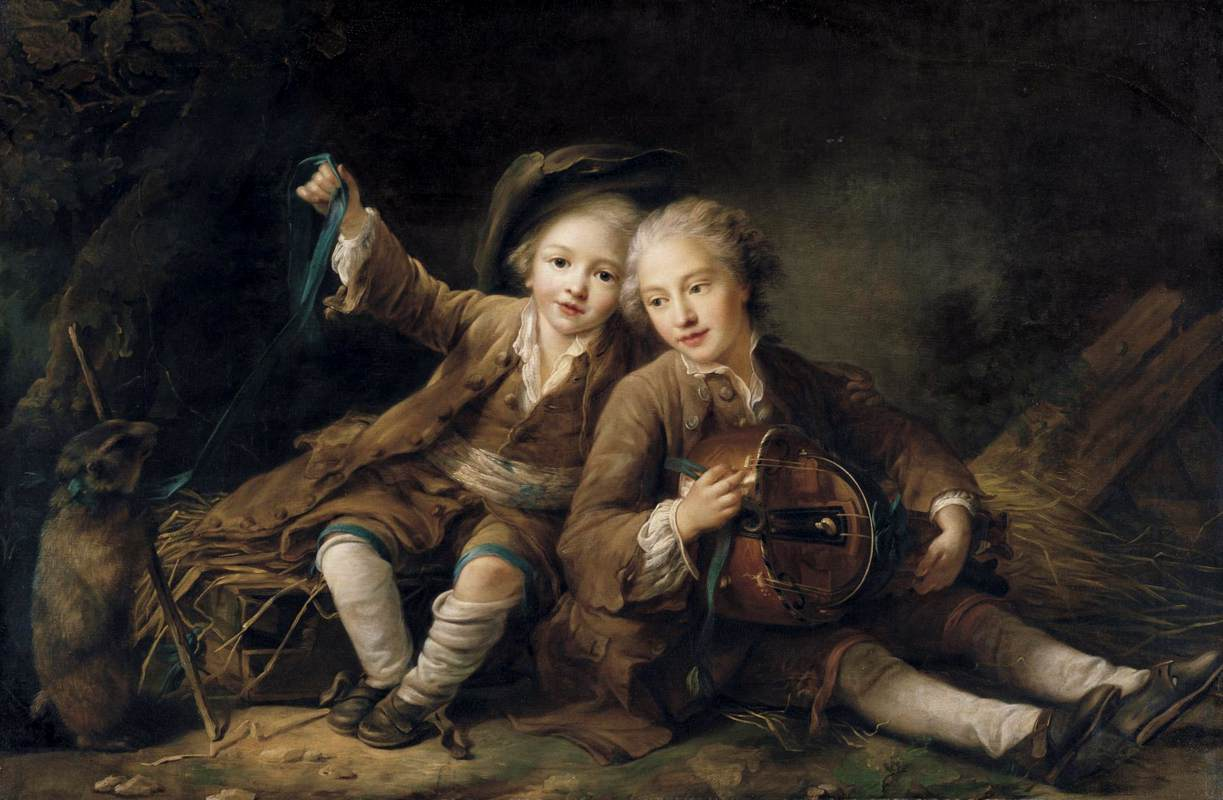
The Children of the Duc de Bouillon by François-Hubert Drouais

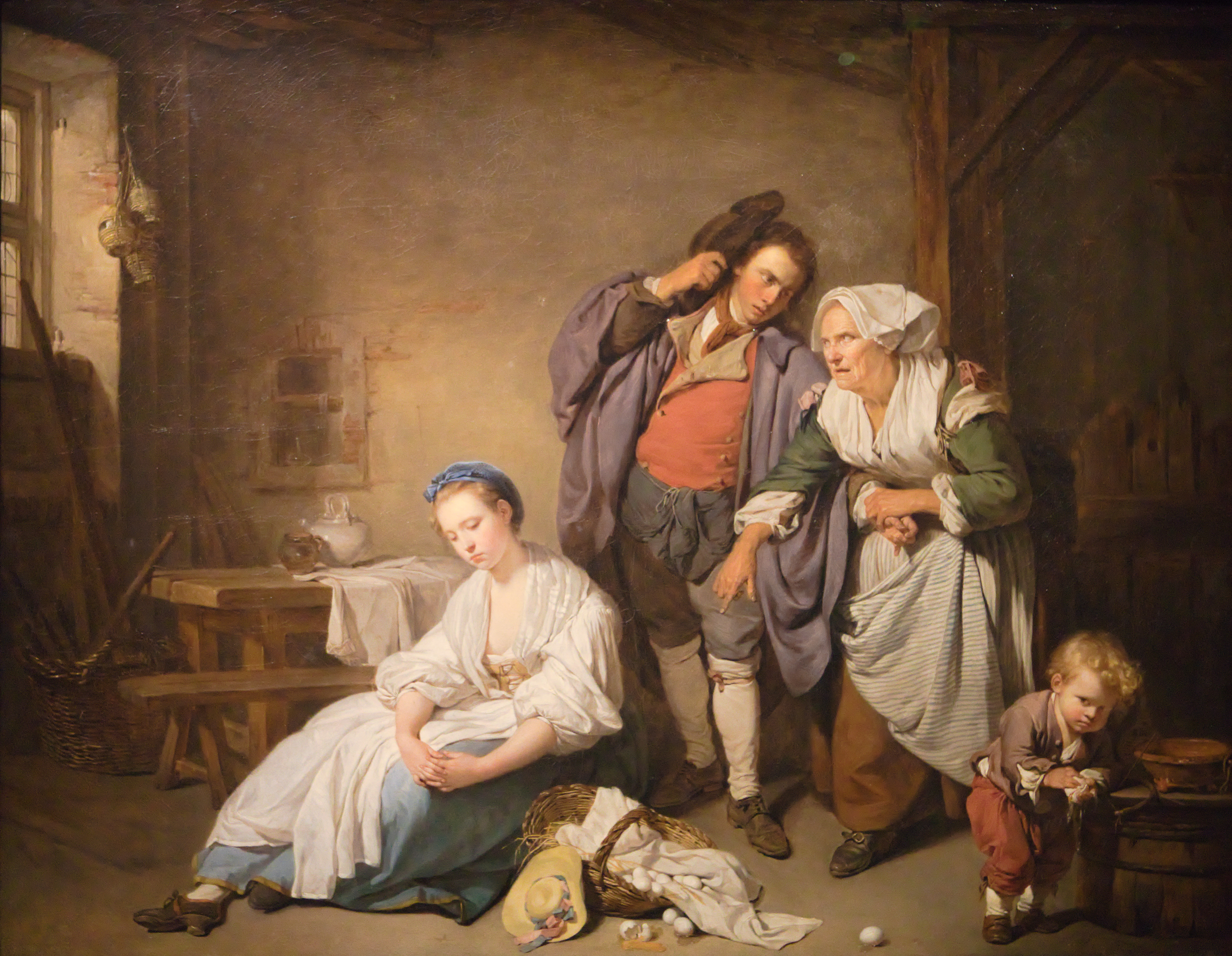
Broken Eggs by Jean-Baptiste Greuze

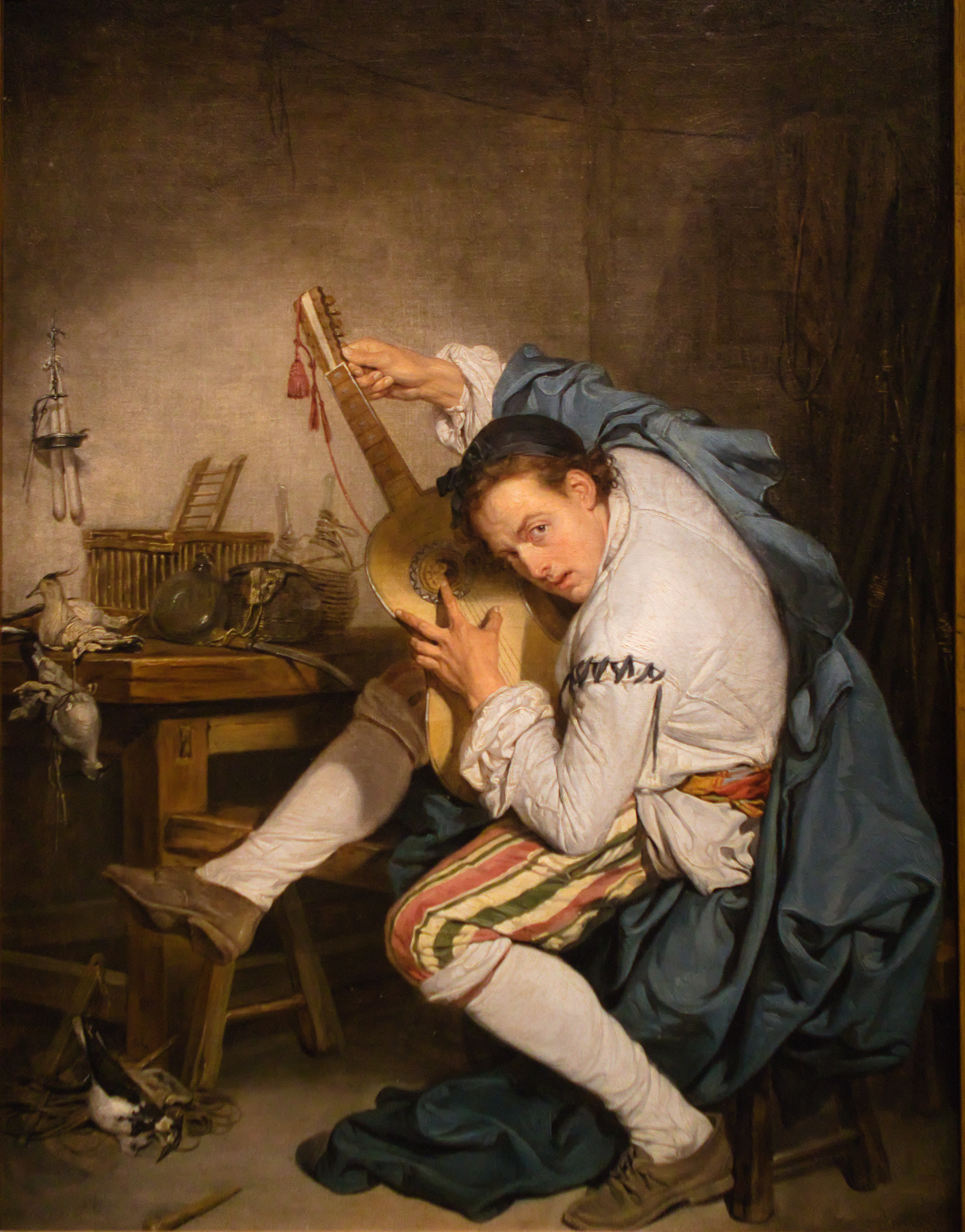
The Guitar Player by Jean-Baptiste Greuze

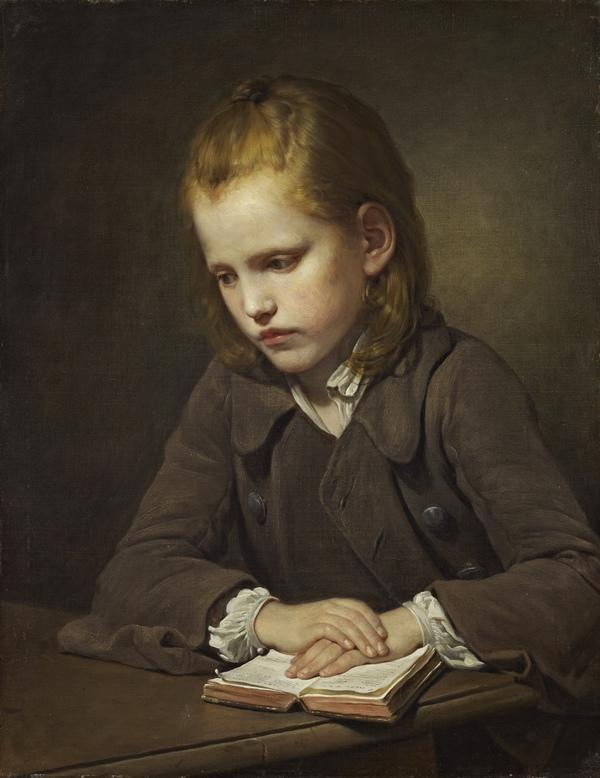
A Boy with a Lesson Book by Jean-Baptiste Greuze

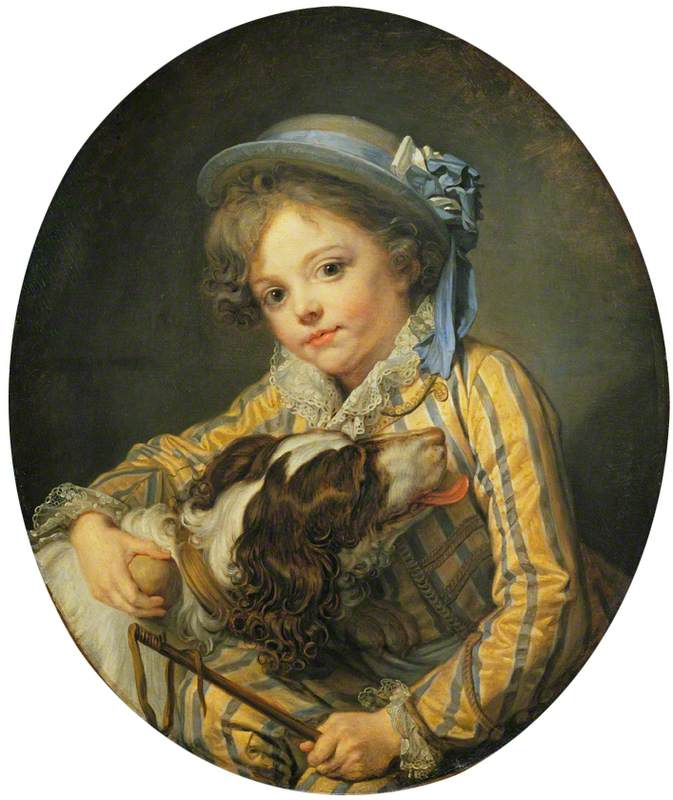
Boy with a Dog by Jean-Baptiste Greuze

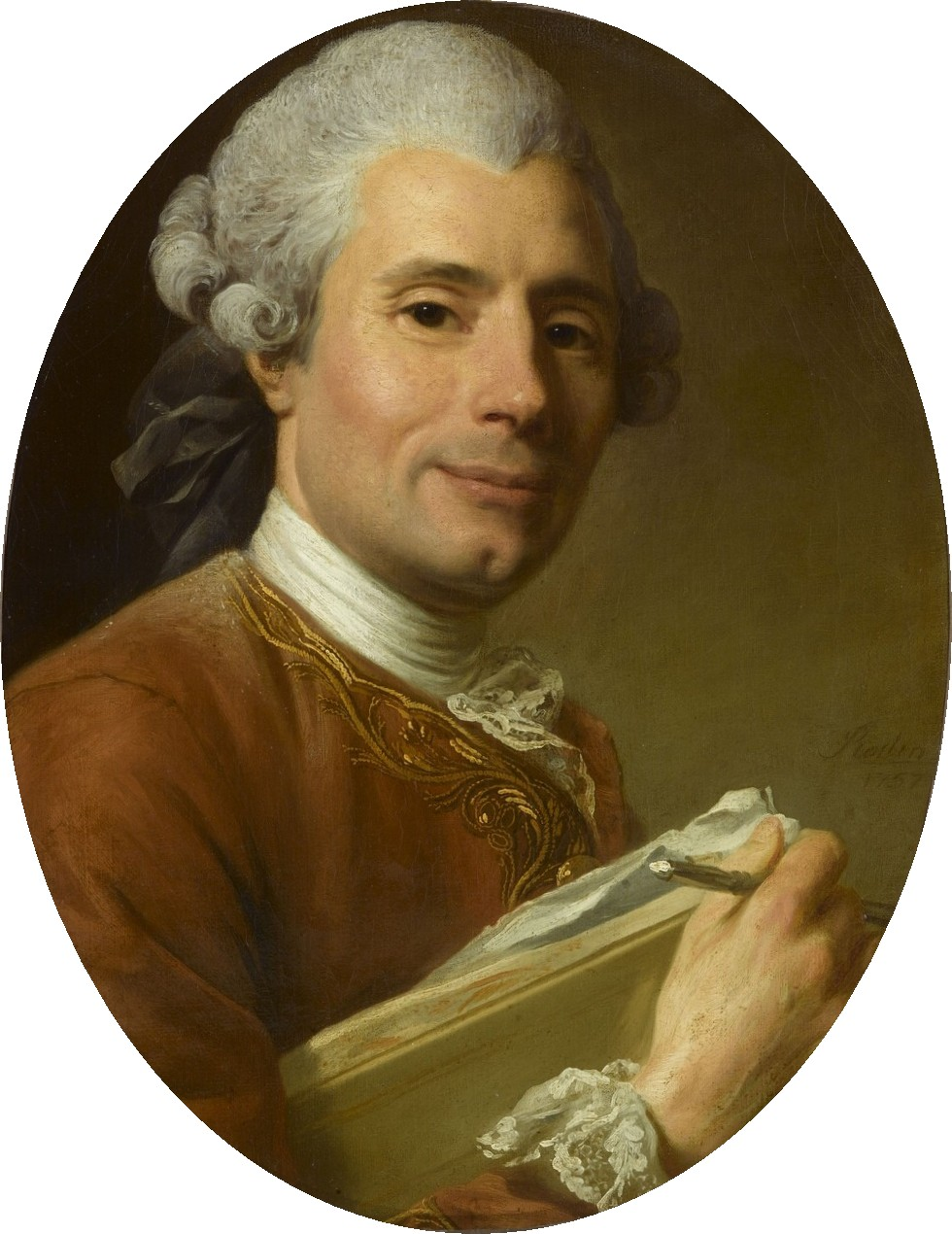
Portrait of Joseph-Marie Vien by Alexander Roslin

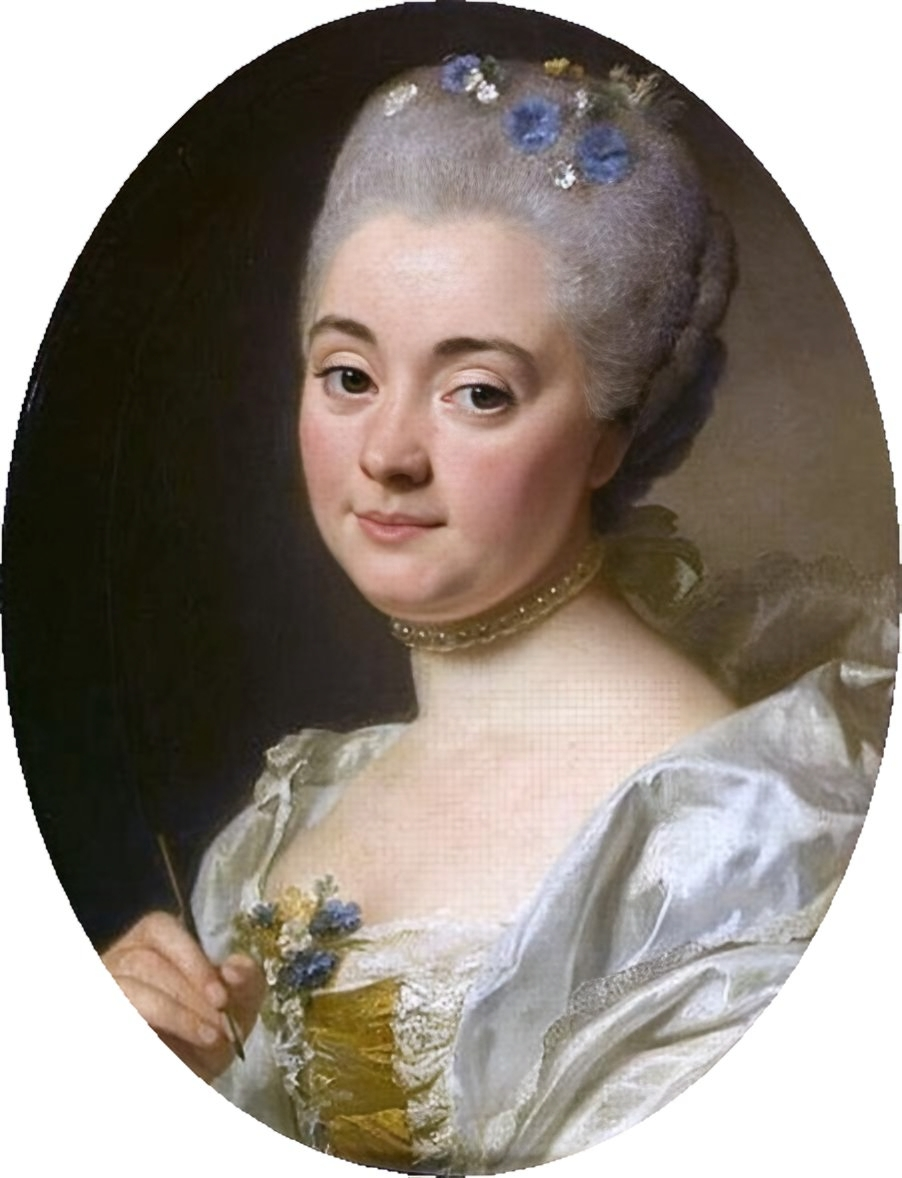
Portrait of Marie-Thérèse Reboul by Alexander Roslin

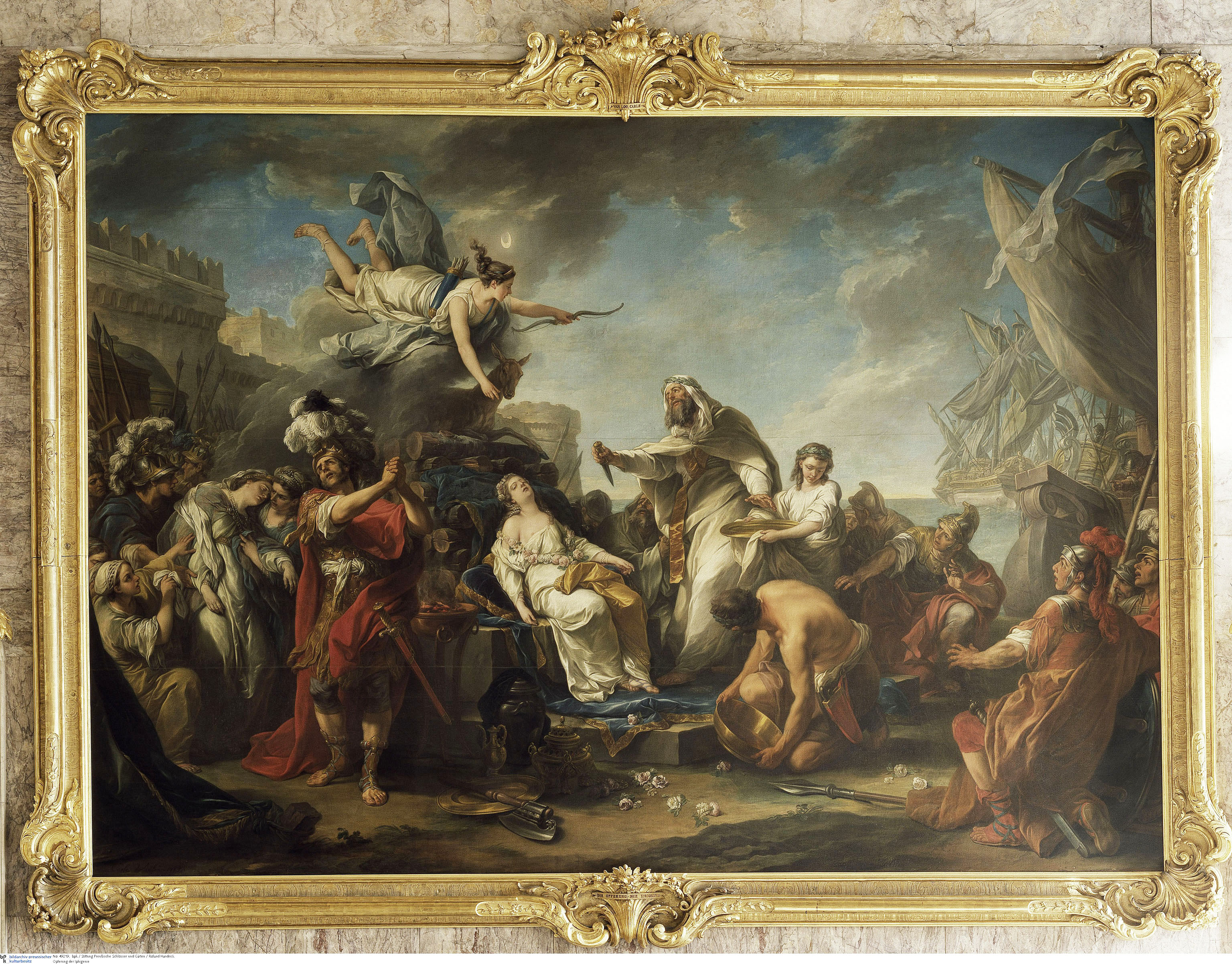
The Sacrifice of Iphigenia by Charles-André van Loo

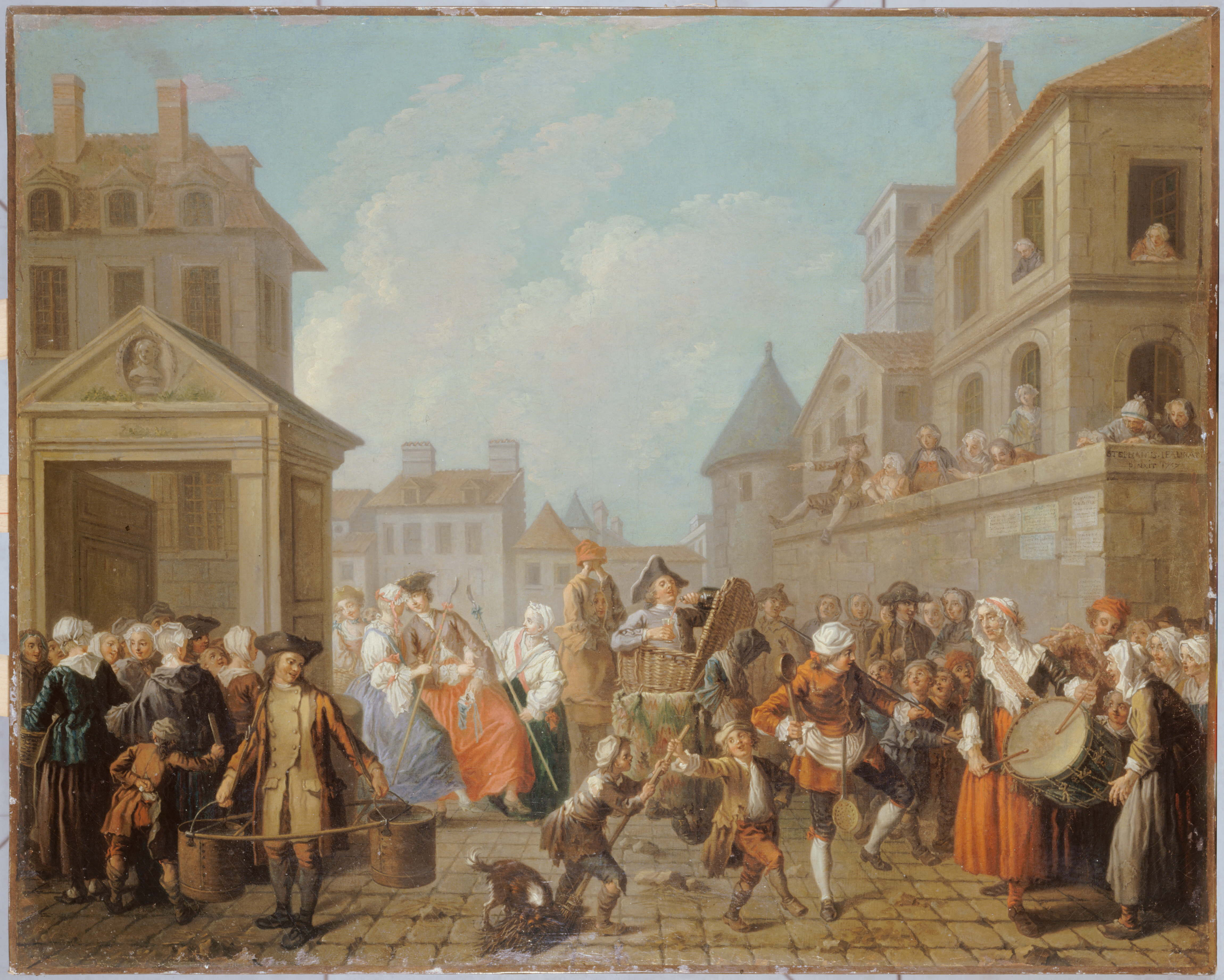
Carnival in the Streets of Paris by Étienne Jeaurat

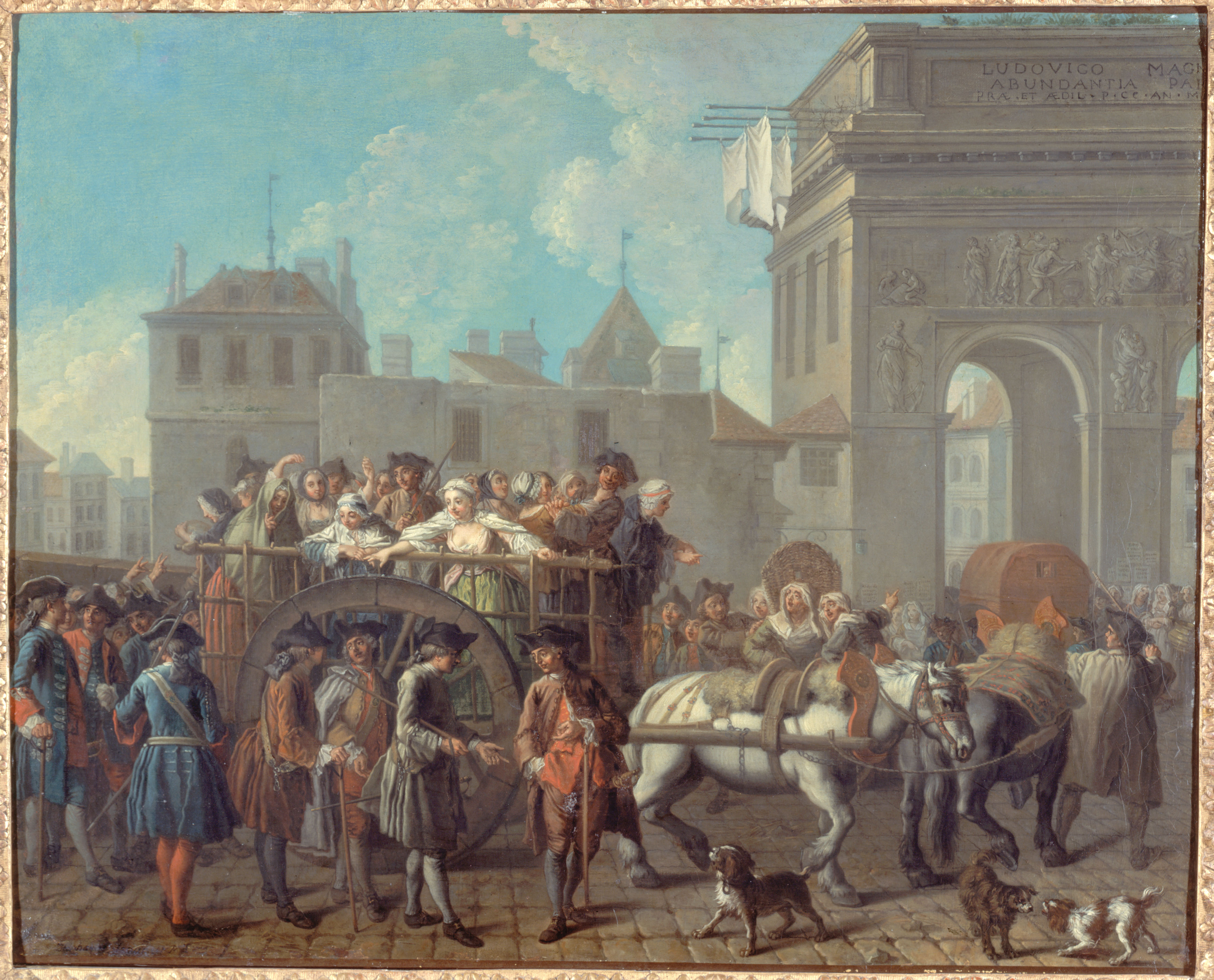
Transport of Prostitutes to the Salpêtrière by Étienne Jeaurat

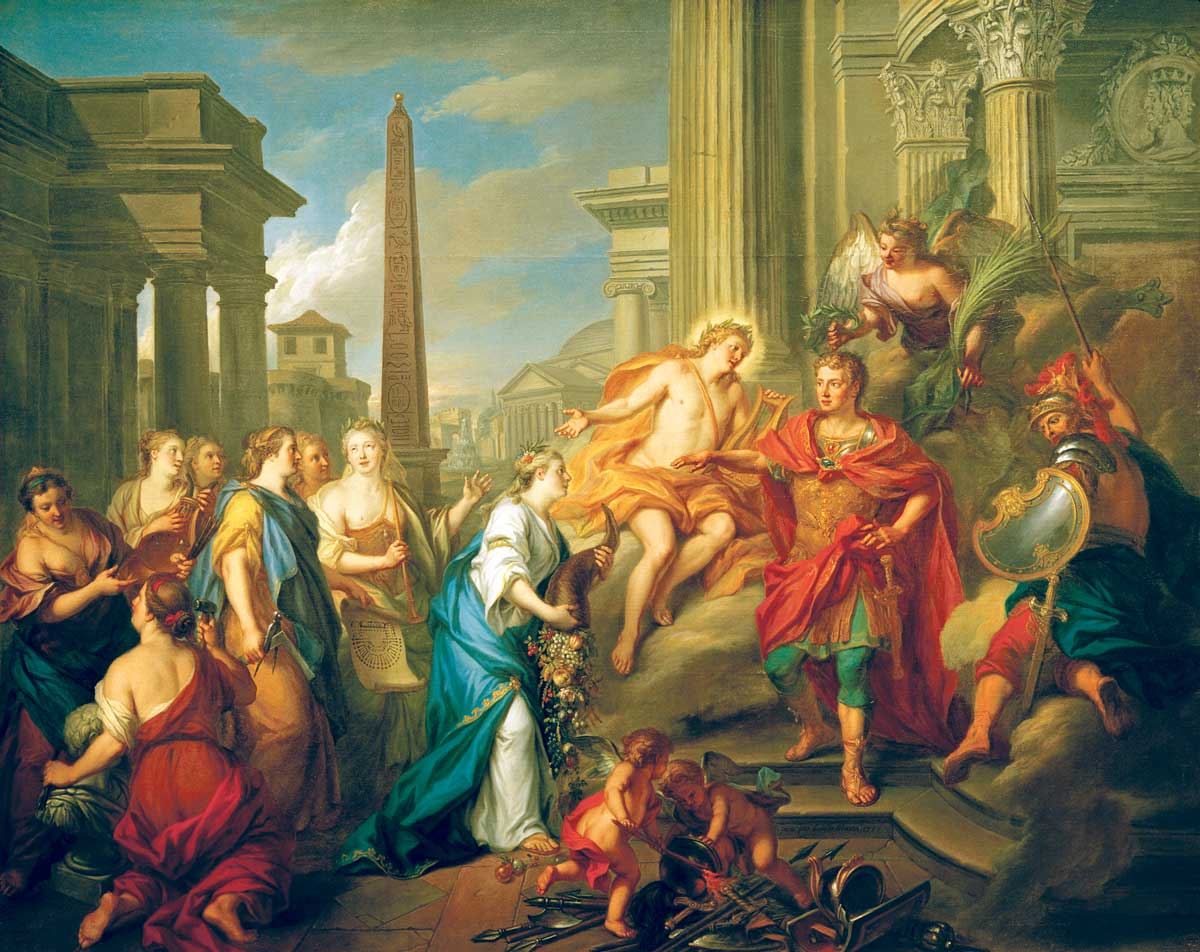
Closing of the Temple of Janus by Augustus by Louis de Silvestre

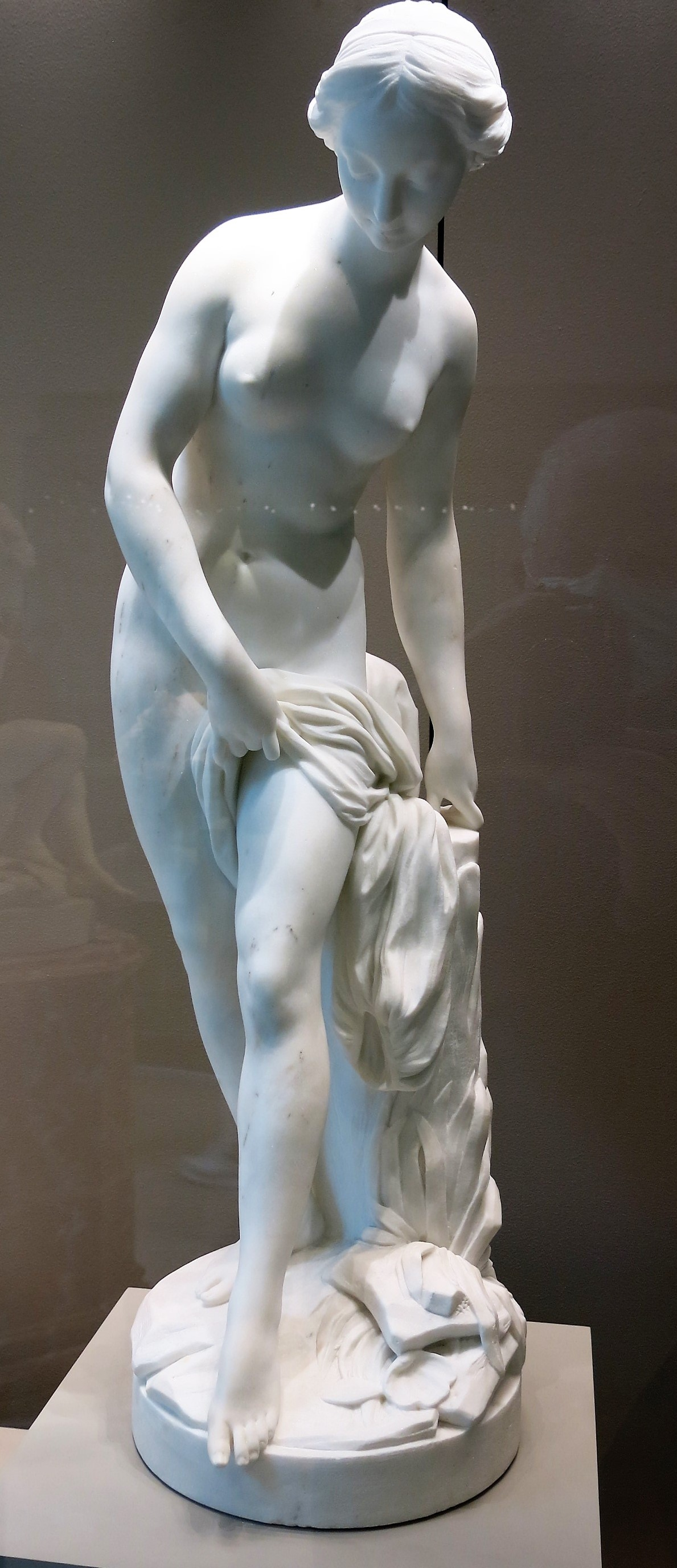
Bather Entering Her Bath by Étienne Maurice Falconet

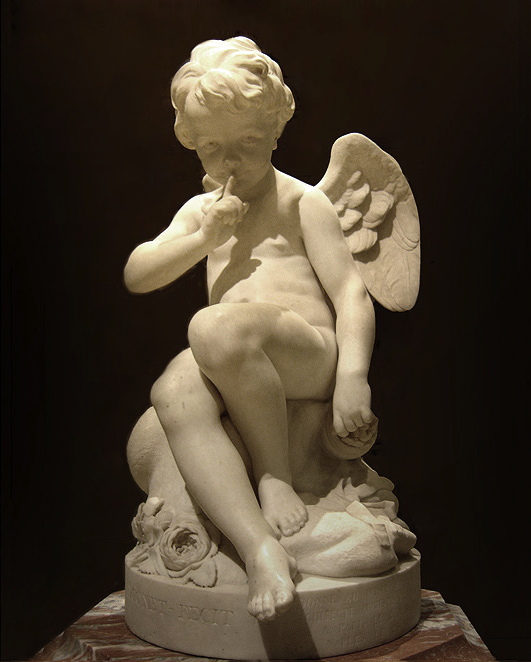
Cupid by Étienne Maurice Falconet

== See also ==
- Salon of 1759, the subsequent Salon held at the Louvre

== Bibliography ==
- Baetjer, Katharine. French Paintings in The Metropolitan Museum of Art from the Early Eighteenth Century through the Revolution. Metropolitan Museum of Art, 2019.
- Bailey, Colin B. The Age of Watteau, Chardin, and Fragonard: Masterpieces of French Genre Painting. Yale University Press, 2003.
- Carlson, Victor I. & Becker, David P. Regency to Empire: French Printmaking, 1715-1814. Baltimore Museum of Art, 1984.
- Levey, Michael. Painting and Sculpture in France, 1700-1789. Yale University Press, 1993.
