= Benoît de Maillet =

French diplomat and natural historian

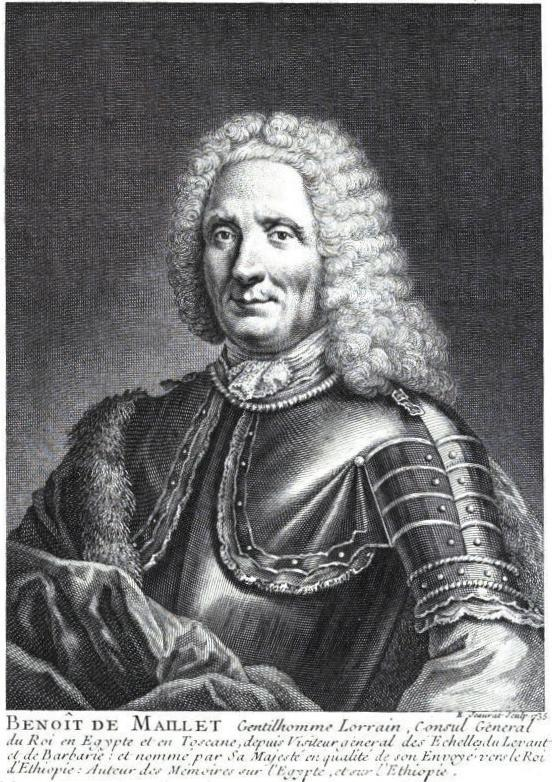
- Benoît de Maillet in Description de l'Egypte, Paris, 1735, by Edme Jeaurat
- Born: 12 April 1656; Saint-Mihiel
- Died: 30 January 1738 (aged 81); Marseille, France
- Occupations: Diplomat and natural historian
- Notable work: Telliamed

Benoît de Maillet (Saint-Mihiel, 12 April 1656 – Marseille, 30 January 1738) was a well-travelled French diplomat and natural historian. He was French consul general at Cairo, and overseer in the Levant. He formulated an evolutionary hypothesis to explain the origin of the Earth and its contents.

De Maillet's geological observations convinced him that the earth could not have been created in an instant because the features of the crust indicate a slow development by natural processes. He also believed that creatures on the land were ultimately derived from creatures living in the seas. He believed in the natural origin of man. He estimated that the development of the Earth took two billion years.

== Life ==
De Maillet was a nobleman of Lorraine, born into a distinguished Catholic family. He did not attend university, but he received an excellent classical education. De Maillet was interested in geology and natural history, and took advantage of his travels to make observations. He was French general consul at Cairo (1692–1708), during which time he studied the Egyptian pyramids, and at Leghorn (1712–1717). He was French overseer in the Levant and the Barbary states from 1715 until his retirement.

== Publication of Telliamed ==
His main work, Telliamed (his name in reverse), was based on manuscripts written between 1722 and 1732 and was published after his death in 1748. The printed text was the result of ten years' editing by the Abbot Jean Baptiste de Mascrier in an attempt to reconcile the proposed system with the dogma of the Catholic Church. De Maillet relied on him even though he had done a poor job editing de Maillet's earlier book Description de l'Egypte (1735). As a result of Mascrier's tinkering, none of the printed editions accurately represents de Maillet's work, though the best is the third and final edition, published in the Hague and Paris in 1755, which includes the only known biography of de Maillet.

As a result of the assiduous textual work by Neubert, who compared in detail the text of the third edition with the content of copied manuscripts, it is possible to say that the 1755 edition differed from the manuscripts by:

1. Additions and modifications of content originating from Benoit by Mascrier.

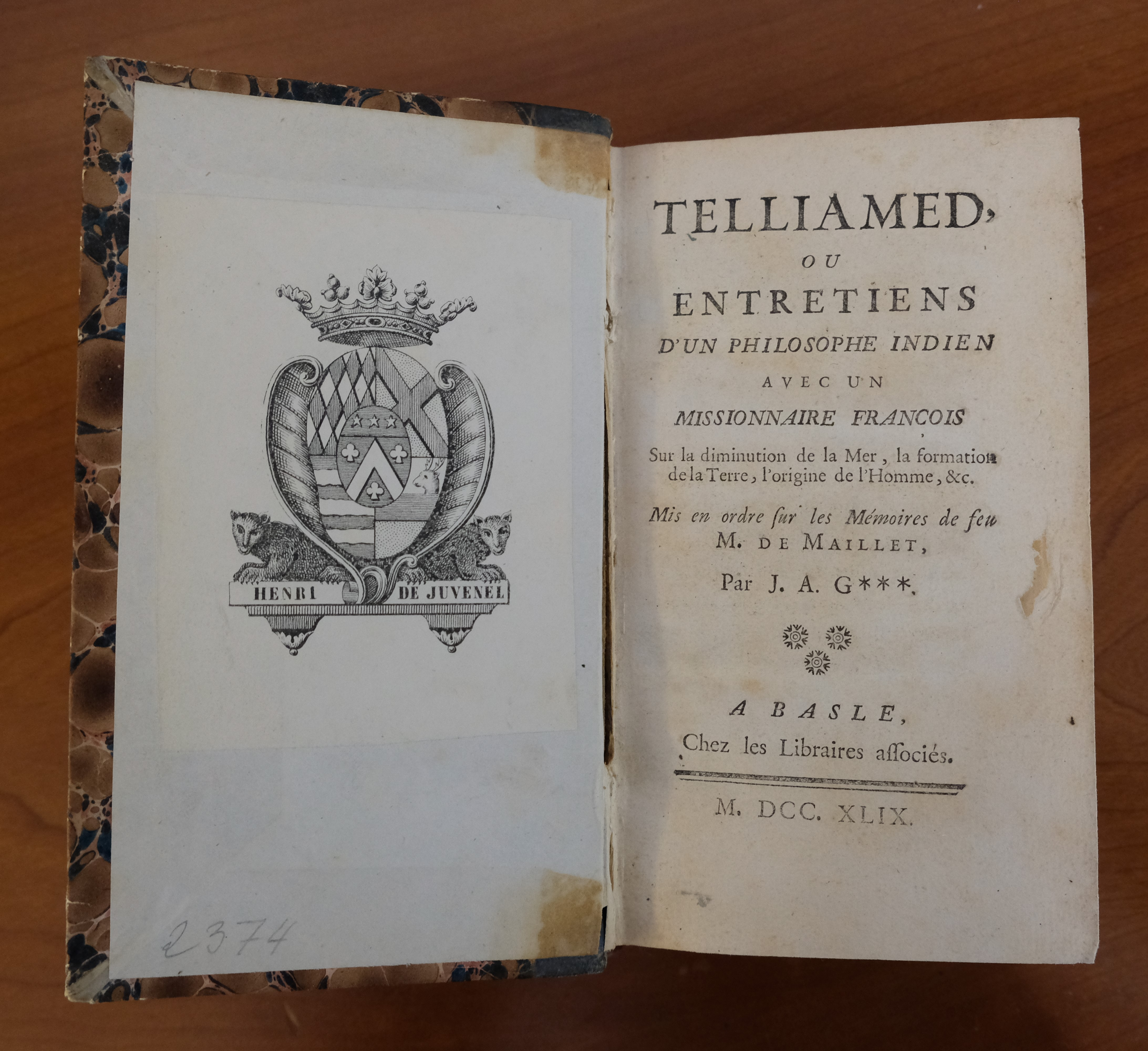
Title page and frontispiece of "Telliamed" (1749)

2. Additions and modifications of content introduced by Mascrier, which often contradict de Maillet's ideas.
3. Modifications in the general arrangement, reorganisation of parts and changes to footnotes by Mascrier to achieve a closer fit with Fontanelle's Entretiens sur la pluralité des mondes.
4. Other modifications, generally of a trivial nature, which are of unknown origin.

With this information as a starting point, it has been possible to largely reconstruct de Maillet's original content. The translation presented in the 1968 edition is not a simple reprint. It is based on the best surviving manuscript, ILL^{1} (Introduction, p. 31). Extensive notes carry explanations, comments, and variations between sources. This edition therefore becomes the basis for any analysis of Maillet's ideas.

The 'Indian philosopher' speaks the views of de Maillet himself. The device is transparently obvious, but understandable because the philosopher contradicts the literal word of the Bible at a time when this still carried some risk to his person and livelihood. The delay in publication can also be interpreted the same way, protecting the author and then protecting the editor, giving the latter time to soften the blow by watering down Maillet's ideas.

== The argument ==
It was, in its essence, an ultraneptunian theory of the Earth, and was to a large extent based on field geology discerned during trips throughout Egypt and other Mediterranean countries. It is based essentially on processes today known as sedimentation, excluding all other geological or geomorphological agents except some minor aspects of weathering. The work, therefore, seems modern as it touches sedimentation, but fantastical when touching other fields. De Maillet observed, but did not always understand, all the major types of rocks forming the Earth's crust.

From the observation of fossilized shells embedded in sedimentary rocks on mountains high above sea level, de Maillet recognized the true nature of fossils. Not appreciating that the land might rise, he concluded that the Earth had originally been entirely covered by water (a theory of René Descartes), which had since been steadily lost into the vortex. De Maillet derived a rate of fall of sea level, of about three inches per century, from sites where former ports were now above sea level. Working back to the highest mountains, he reached a figure of 2.4 billion years for the age of the Earth, so he thought it quite reasonable to accept that at least 2 billion years had passed since the Earth was covered with water. Of course, this attempt is flawed in several ways, but it contains the seed of real progress. He saw the importance of slow natural processes operating over long periods of time, forming and shaping the Earth. He introduced the idea that the Earth might be billions of years old, which even a century and a half after his death would have been denied.

De Maillet's idea on biology had a similar basis. He thought that life had begun in the water, after the emergence of the highest mountains, but before the continents. He believes that life arose in the shallows surrounding the first land. Sea life, fish, shellfish, algae, diversified and their remains were covered with sediment and became secondary rocks laid down on the sides of primitive mountains. When continents emerged from the water, so did marine organisms. From seaweed developed trees and shrubs, from flying fish came birds. Man's career began as a fish.

The context for this proto-evolutionary thought is de Maillet's belief that space contained the seeds of life, invisible spores always available for seeding. This theory of the origin of life is called panspermia. The really important observation he made was that the lower layers of sedimentary rocks contained animals and plants different from those of today, and some types that were unrecognizable. He appreciated that this was a critical issue and offered several explanations, none of which reach the present idea of evolution.

De Maillet's ideas on the history of mankind are the weakest part of his conception. He incorporates a number of myths and traditions which are simply incorrect. His system of calculating time does not work because no remains of humans are present in the kind of sedimentary rocks he examined. He believes man has a long history, that he originated in the water, and developed into a land animal. He knows it is a problem that men do not look as though they were sea creatures, but his explanations of such difficulties are feeble. What he had done was to "combine a correct understanding of artefacts of the Iron and Bronze Ages with the erroneous interpretation of Cainozoic vertebrates as human skeletons, and silicified logs in fluvio-continental deposits as petrified ships (as Steno did)."
