= Reigny Abbey =

Abbey in Yonne, France

Coordinates: 47°38′45″N 3°43′40″E

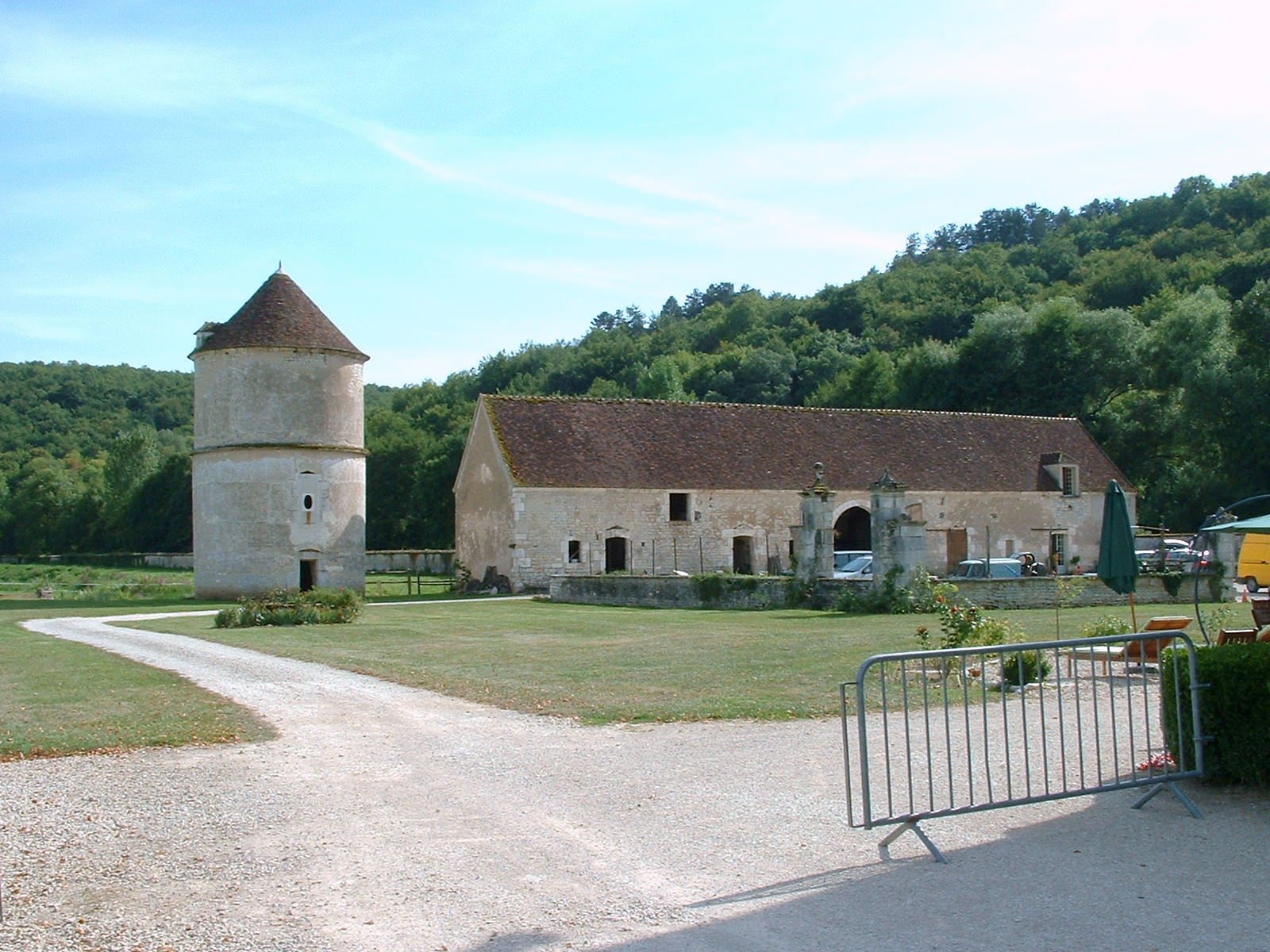
Reigny Abbey

Reigny Abbey (Abbaye de Reigny) was a Cistercian monastery in Vermenton, department of Yonne, Bourgogne, France.

== History ==
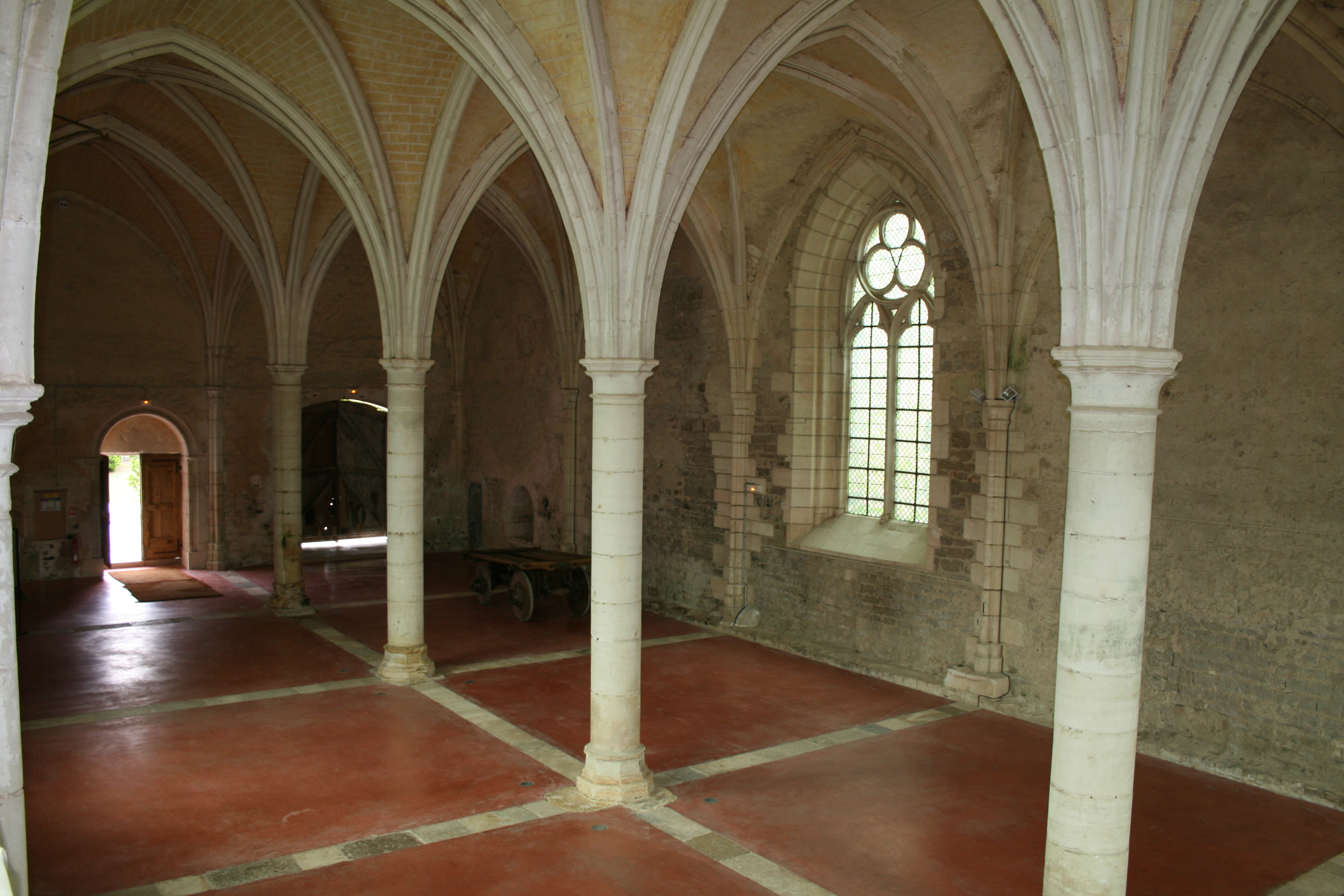
Refectory

The abbey was founded in 1104 at Fontemoy as a hermitage, or small priory, by the knight Anseric of Avallon and Gui of Noyers. it grew quickly and in 1128 was accepted into the Cistercian Order as a daughter house of Clairvaux Abbey. The first abbot was Stephen of Toucy, a monk of Clairvaux. In 1134 the monastery was moved to the present site on the right bank of the river Cure, a gift to the community from William II, Count of Auxerre and Nevers. In 1147 it was granted papal protection by Pope Eugene II.

The abbey continued to thrive and at its peak numbered up to 300 monks. The generosity of the local nobility provided it with sufficient estates to maintain this large population and engage in active trade with its surplus produce. In 1370 King Charles V of France granted it royal protection, and in 1493 Charles VIII made it a fondation royale. It suffered severely however both during the Hundred Years' War and in the French Wars of Religion. In 1582 the Huguenots destroyed most of it by fire, including the church.

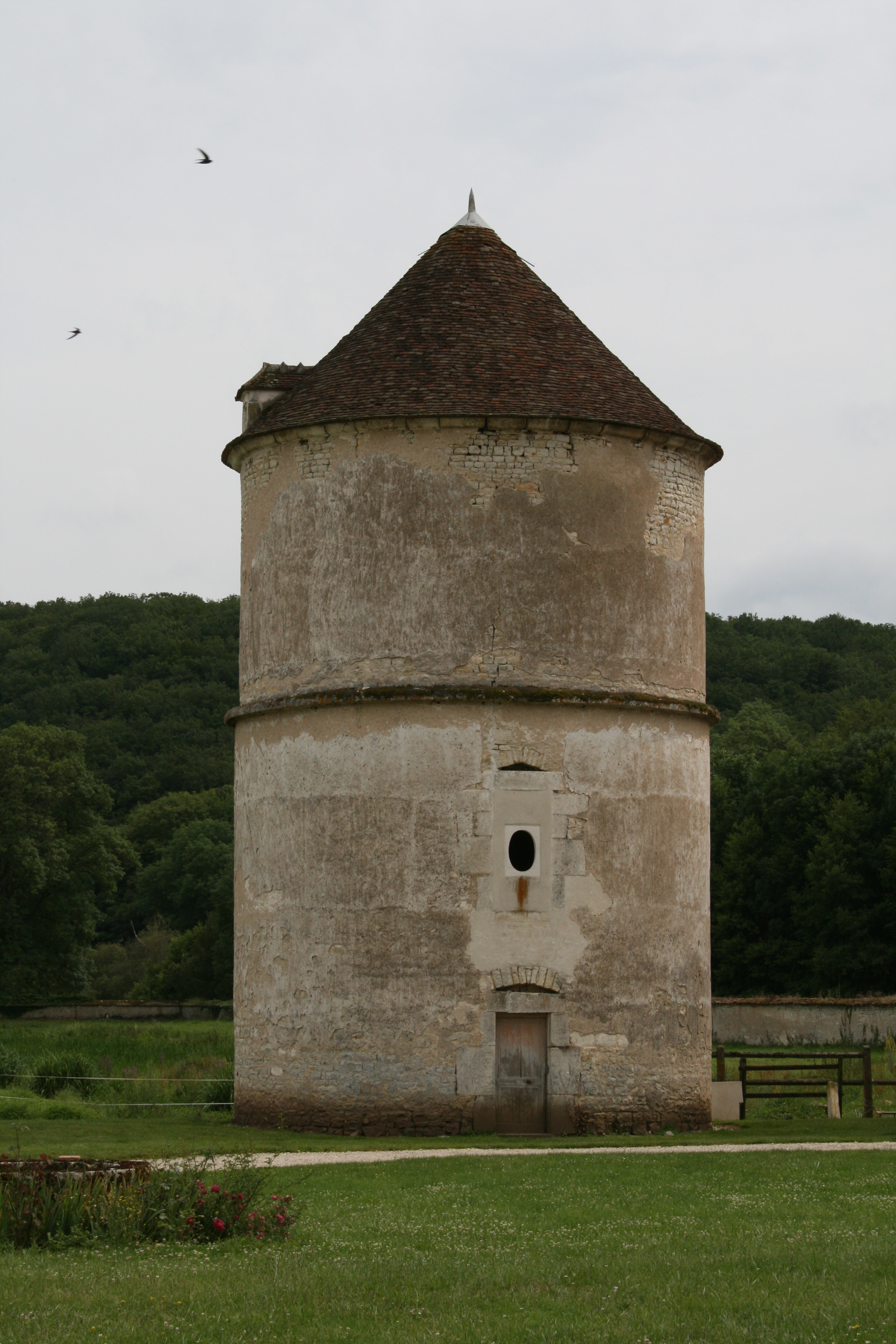
Dovecote

The monastic buildings were rebuilt during the 17th-18th centuries. The new church was completed in 1759–1765; the work is often attributed to Claude-Nicolas Ledoux but according to the French Ministry of Culture and Communication is by the less well-known royal architect Claude-Louis d'Aviler.

The abbey was dissolved in 1790 during the French Revolution; the community at that point comprised eight monks. Many of the buildings, among them the new church, the cloisters, the chapter house and the greater part of the conventual buildings, were destroyed. Many decorative items from the former abbey church are still to be found in churches nearby.

The precinct and surviving buildings, principally comprising the exceptional 14th century refectory, the 17th century dovecote and part of the south range of the conventual buildings restored in the 18th century, including the monks' parlour and dormitory, passed into private ownership. The site is now commercially run as a conference and event centre.

The abbey site was classed as a monument historique in 1920.

== Sources and external links ==
- Abbaye de Reigny website, incl. pictures (in French)
- Cistercensi: Reigny (in Italian)
- Reigny Abbey cartulary (in French)
