= Edme Jeaurat =

French engraver (1688–1738)

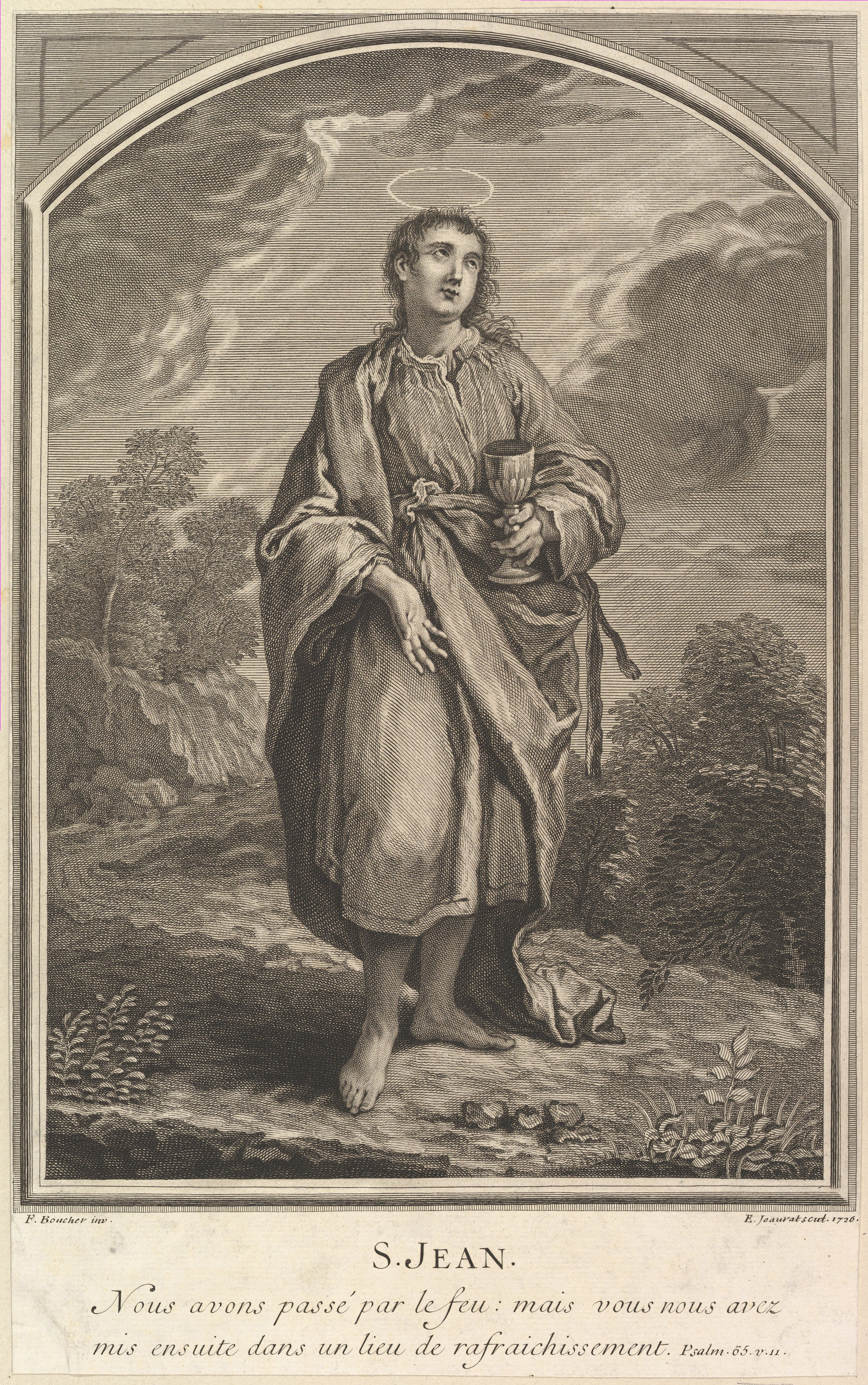
Saint Jean (1726)

Edme Jeaurat (1688–1738) was a French engraver from Vermenton, then in the Province of Burgundy.

Jeaurat was the son of an engraver and the elder brother of painter Etienne Jeaurat. His father took young Edme to Paris and apprenticed him to Bernard Picart. After working there many years, Jeaurat moved to the Netherlands, where he made his living producing engravings of the great paintings in Amsterdam and The Hague, while studying Dutch painting.

Upon his return to Paris, he was reunited with his brother, whom he had not seen in many years. He began engraving Etienne's paintings and became known for his accurate work. Jeaurat was also employed by Pierre Crozat to engrave pictures for his famous collection. In 1722 in Paris, he married Marie-Charlotte Le Clerc, the sister of the artist Le Clerc, and many of his engravings are of the religious pictures painted by his brother-in-law. He had two sons, Nicolas Henri, a painter of still lifes, and Edme-Sébastien, who eventually devoted himself to science and became an astronomer.

There is a fine collection of Edme Jeaurat's engravings in the British Museum, and they can also be studied in the Bibliothèque Nationale in Paris. His finest work is said to be "Achilles discovered among the Daughters of Lycomedes" from 1713, and he also made engravings of works by Poussin, Veronese, and Watteau.
