= Sacy, Yonne =

Sacy
- Part of Vermenton
- Location of Sacy
- Location within France Location within Bourgogne-Franche-Comté
- Coordinates: 47°40′06″N 3°49′15″E
- Country: France
- Region: Bourgogne-Franche-Comté
- Department: Yonne
- Arrondissement: Auxerre
- Canton: Joux-la-Ville
- Commune: Vermenton
- Area^{1}: 27.70 km^{2} (10.70 sq mi)
- Highest elevation: 284 m (932 ft)
- Lowest elevation: 137 m (449 ft)
- Population (2022): 169
  - Density: 6.10/km^{2} (15.8/sq mi)
- Time zone: UTC+01:00 (CET)
  - Summer (DST): UTC+02:00 (CEST)
- Postal code: 89270
- ^{1} French Land Register data, which excludes lakes, ponds, glaciers > 1 km^{2} (0.386 sq mi or 247 acres) and river estuaries.

Sacy (French pronunciation: [sasi]) is a former commune in the Yonne department in Bourgogne-Franche-Comté in north-central France. On 1 January 2016, it was merged into the commune of Vermenton.

== See also ==
- Communes of the Yonne department
