= The Guitar Player (Greuze) =

Painting by Jean-Baptiste Greuze

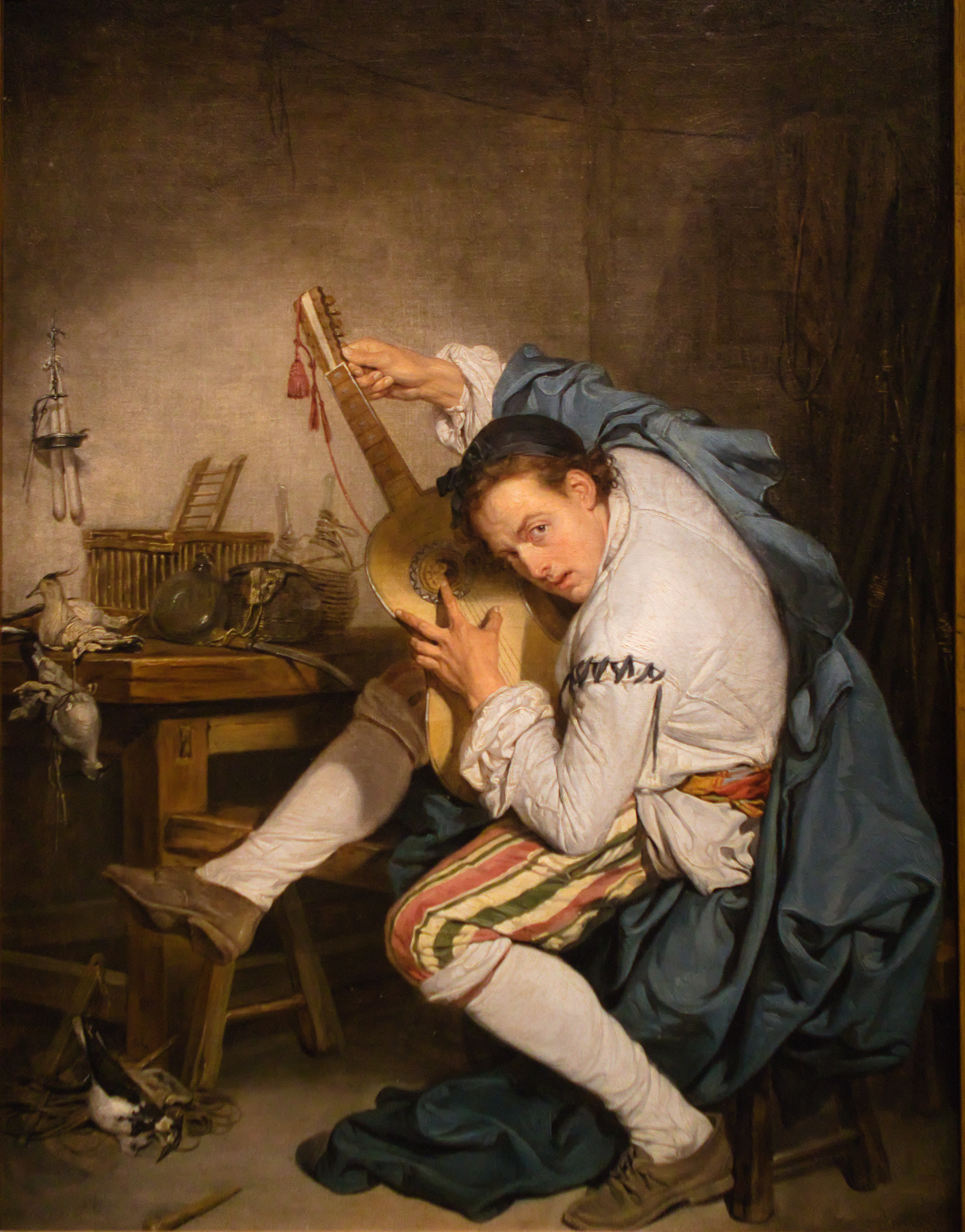
- Artist: Jean-Baptiste Greuze
- Year: c. 1757
- Medium: Oil-on-canvas
- Dimensions: 64 cm × 48 cm (25.1 in × 18.8 in)
- Location: National Museum, Warsaw

The Guitar Player or The Guitarist is a c. 1757 oil-on-canvas painting by the French artist Jean-Baptiste Greuze, produced during his stay in Rome. It is now on display in Room VII (part of the Italian and French rooms) at the National Museum, Warsaw (inv. No. M. Ob. 914). It shows a young man tuning a guitar, with hunting accessories in the left background symbolising his being a bird-hunter (a common symbol for a seducer).

The work was first exhibited at the Paris Salon of 1757 – a second autograph version is now in the Musée des Beaux-Arts in Nantes, the artist's hometown. Art historians argue that both versions are examples of genre painting, inspired by Dutch art.

== Provenance ==
Previously owned by JBL Boyer de Fonscolombe, in the mid-19th century it was purchased by Ksawery Branicki, who around 1900 took it to Poland, where it was housed at Rose Branicka's home on Nowy Świat in Warsaw and in Wilanów. In 1926, when the Branicki estate was divided between three heirs, the painting passed to Branickich Reyowej of the Branicki family, who took it to Przecław.

During World War II, the picture was hidden near Kraków. When the family decided to leave Poland before the Russian invasion, its artworks were moved as part of the 'Sapieżyński store' to the Metropolitan Curia's stores in Kraków. In 1952 the state confiscated the works in the 'Sapieżyński store' and in 1954 the work was placed in its present home. In 1990, 1997 and 2003, three different heirs of the painting's pre-war owners took legal steps to recover it. Two court hearings were held, one ordering the work to be returned and the second reversing that decision.
