= Edme-Sébastien Jeaurat =

French astronomer (1725–1803)

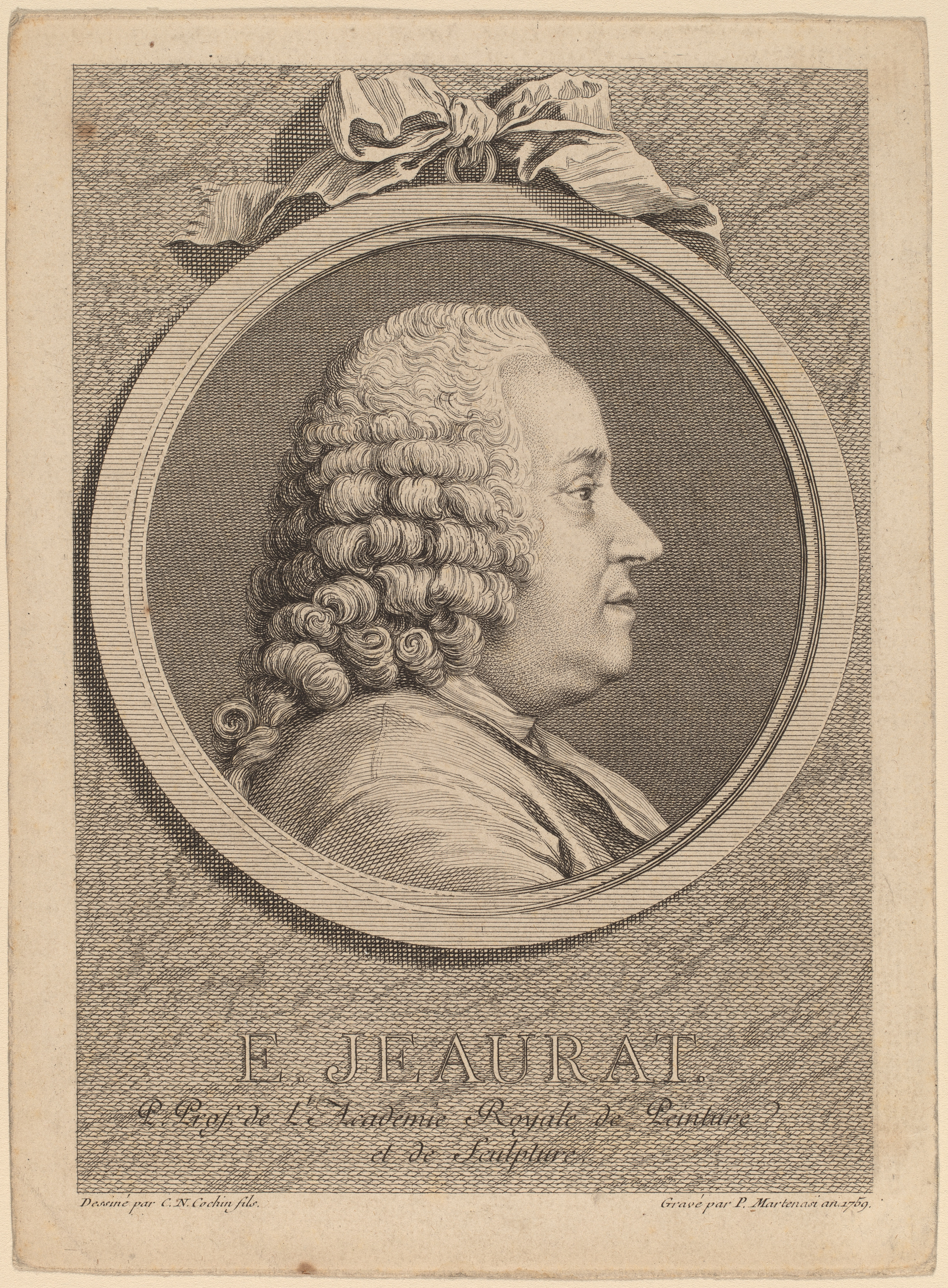
- Edme-Sébastien Jeaurat
- Born: 14 September 1725; Paris, France
- Died: 7 March 1803 (aged 77); Paris, France
- Citizenship: French
- Known for: map of the Pleiades
- Scientific career
- Fields: Astronomy

Edme-Sébastien Jeaurat (14 September 1725 – 7 March 1803) was a French astronomer most notable for publishing a map of the 64 stars of the Pleiades in 1786. He was a member of the French Academy of Sciences. He originally studied art, receiving a medal from the French Academy of Painting and published an art book "Essai de perspective à l'usage des artistes" in 1750. His parents were Edme Jeaurat and Marie-Charlotte born Le Clerc. He was the first founder of various settlements that were taken over by the École Militaire in favor of astronomy. He was elected a Foreign Honorary Member of the American Academy of Arts and Sciences in 1783.
