= Vulcan Presenting Venus with Arms for Aeneas (Boucher) =

Painting by François Boucher

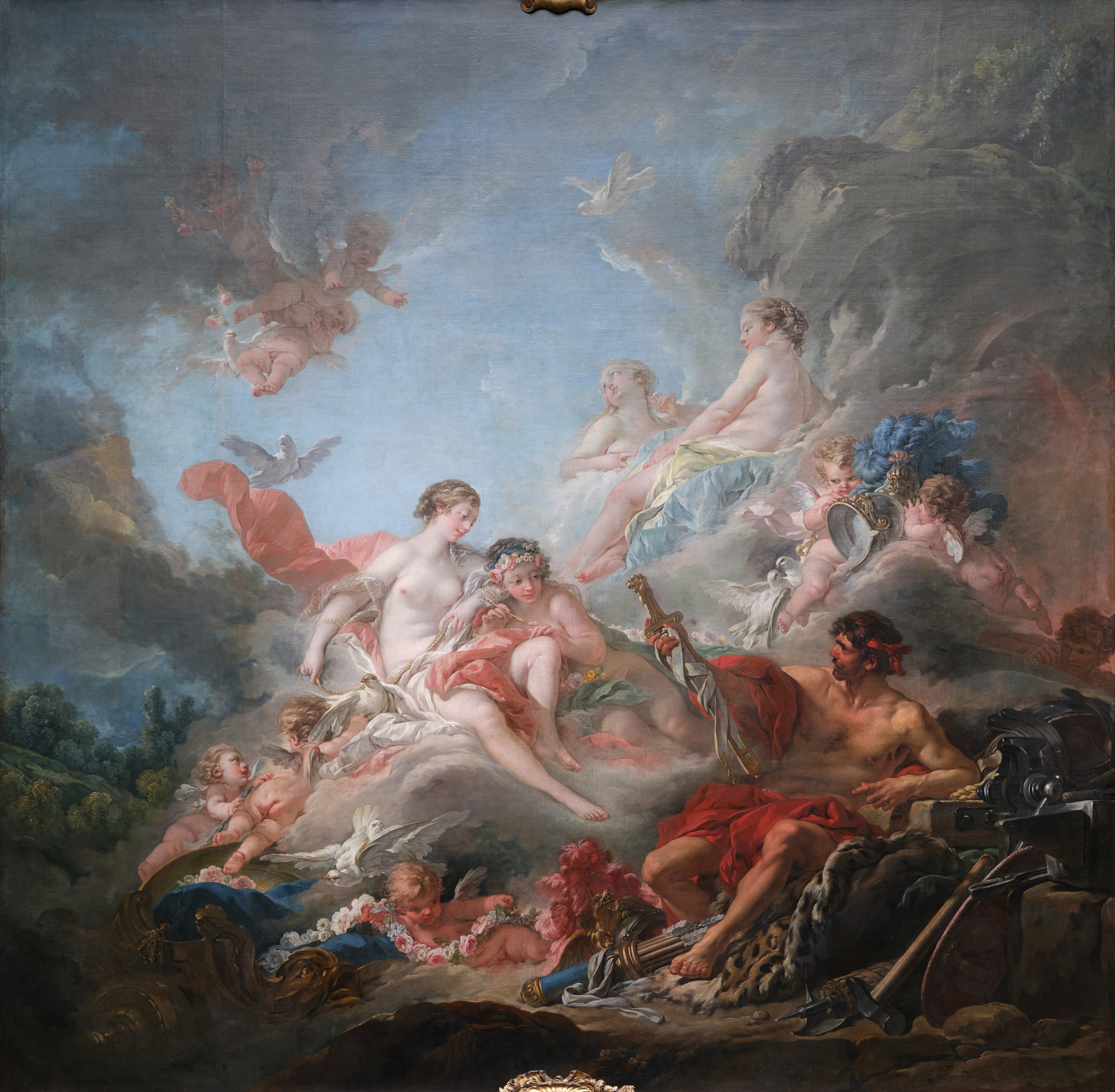
- Artist: François Boucher
- Year: 1757
- Medium: Oil on canvas
- Dimensions: 320 cm × 320 cm (130 in × 130 in)
- Location: Louvre, Paris

Vulcan Presenting Venus with Arms for Aeneas, also known as Venus at Vulcan's Forge, (French: Les Forges de Vulcain) is an oil-on-canvas painting by the French painter François Boucher, executed in 1757. He produced it as the basis for one work in a series of four tapestries devoted to "the loves of the gods" for King Louis XV (the other works in the series were designed by Charles-André van Loo, Jean-Baptiste Marie Pierre, and Joseph-Marie Vien). It is in the Rococo style and depicts the homely but muscular Vulcan (shown on the ground on the right) in a scene from the eighth book of the Aeneid. Vulcan is shown offering to the more celestial Venus the weapons he has forged for her son Aeneas. This mythological theme recurred throughout Boucher's artistic career. The work was less well received than other works in the series, particularly those of Pierre and Vien. Today, the painting resides in the Louvre in Paris.

== Creation of the painting ==
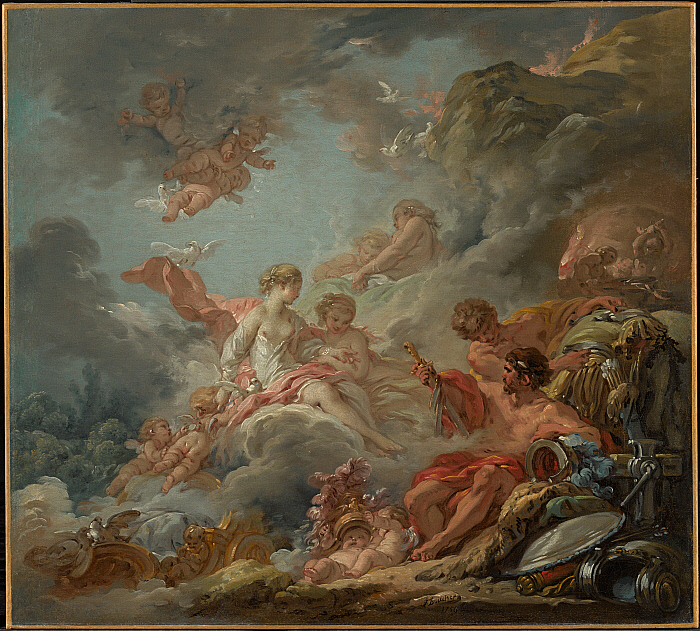
François Boucher, Venus at Vulcan's Forge, oil sketch on canvas, 1756. Sterling and Francine Clark Art Institute.

Boucher created this piece following his 1755 appointment as inspecteur at the Gobelins Manufactory, a prestigious tapestry workshop serving the French royal court. His profitable designs for Beauvais, a rival workshop, led Gobelins to secure his exclusive services that year. In November, Marigny, Minister of the Arts, proposed seven new tapestries for King Louis XV’s apartments at Compiègne, though the project was never approved. However, it may have inspired Boucher’s 1756 color sketch of the painting.

In May 1757, the King finally approved a four-tapestry commission, The Loves of the Gods, assigning each piece to a different prominent artist at the time: Charles-André van Loo, Boucher, Jean-Baptiste Marie Pierre, and Joseph-Marie Vien. By the end of August, the full-scale designs of the tapestry commissions were exhibited at the Salon, though Boucher’s submission was delayed despite his early start. Following the exhibition, the paintings were sent to Gobelins for weaving. In 1758, the artists were tasked with two additional narrow tapestry panels. Boucher’s contribution, The Target of Love (French: La Cible d’Amour), is now in the Louvre.

== Reception ==
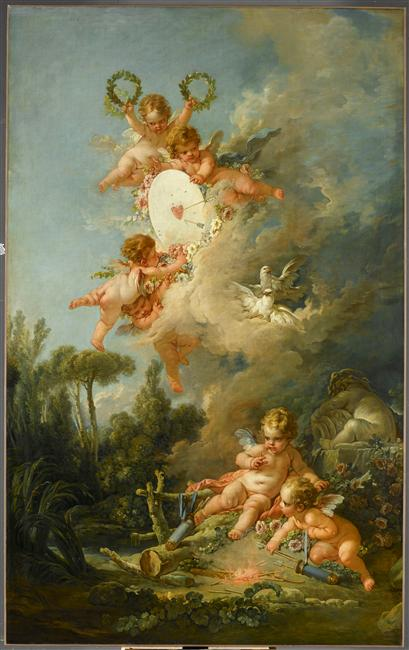
La Cible d'Amour (The Target of Love), oil on canvas, François Boucher, 1758, Louvre

The tapestries designed by Boucher and Vanloo appear to have been less successful than those of Vien and Pierre. Fewer versions of Boucher's tapestry were purchased from Gobelins than those of Vien and Pierre. The reasons for this comparative unpopularity remain unclear, but some speculate that it might be due to Boucher’s composition lacking a unified design.

Nonetheless, Marigny seemed to have taken a liking to the work as he kept the colored sketches to himself. This was noteworthy given that Boucher usually kept his own tapestry sketches. The only other known exception is that of the chinoiserie tapestries which ended up with a friend of Boucher.

== Subject and interpretation ==
Boucher’s painting depicts a scene from Book VIII of the Aeneid, where Venus returns to collect the divine weapons that she had previously seduced her husband, Vulcan, into forging for her son, Aeneas. Although the painting was originally titled Venus at Vulcan’s Forge or The Forge of Lemnos at the Salon exhibition, it is now more commonly referred to as Venus Requesting Arms for Aeneas. However, this title is somewhat misleading, as the scene does not depict Venus requesting the weapons, but rather arriving to retrieve them. The Aeneid did not depict this scene in detail, so Boucher took creative freedom in his painting, as seen with the addition of Cupid scattering roses, the Hours, and the Graces. The symbolic meaning of the rose-crowned nymph on Venus's lap remains uncertain. However, the nymph's contact with Cupid’s dart symbolizes the power of love that Venus used to trick her husband into obeying her orders.

== Artistic ideals ==
The depiction of Venus at Vulcan's Forge was a recurring theme for Boucher throughout his artistic career. He appreciated the artistic opportunities this subject provided to portray cupids surrounding a woman's figure, alongside masculine forms and mythological elements. Thus, when his pupil Johann Christian von Mannlich sought advice for a 1765 commission from his patron Duke Christian IV of Zweibrücken, Boucher naturally suggested Venus Coming to Vulcan to Ask for Arms for Her Son Aeneas. Boucher's critiques of Mannlich's work reveal his methodology and inspiration for depicting the female figure. He commented that Mannlich's female figures appeared either too thin or too masculine, asserting that ideal feminine beauty required a delicate and round form—qualities that, among all his models, he claimed only his gilder's wife possessed. His artistic interventions in Mannlich's composition, specifically positioning Venus atop clouds which was a distinctly Baroque element that drew the Duke's disapproval, exemplified how Boucher's artistic decisions increasingly conflicted with evolving artistic preferences from the public in his final years.
