= Étienne Jeaurat =

French painter (1699–1789)

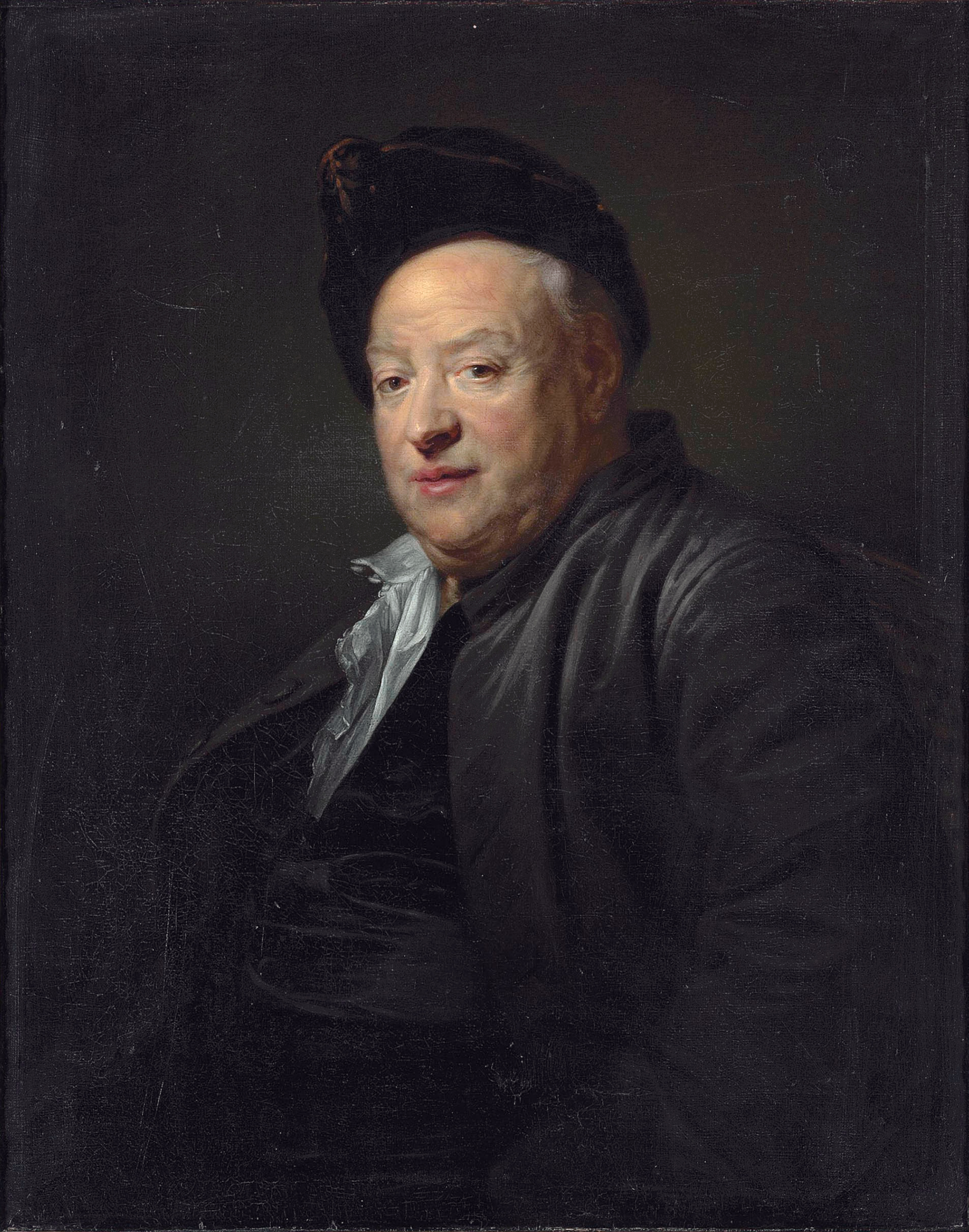
Étienne Jeaurat, painted by Circle of Jean-Baptiste Greuze

Étienne Jeaurat (9 February 1699 – 14 December 1789) was a French painter, above all remembered for his lively street scenes.

== Early life ==
Born in Vermenton near Auxerre, Jeaurat became an orphan at an early age. His brother, the engraver Edme Jeaurat, entrusted him to Nicolas Vleughels, a friend of Antoine Watteau, who was appointed director of the Académie de France in Rome in 1724. Vleughels took Jeaurat to Rome for an extended stay, exerting considerable influence on his work.

== Career ==
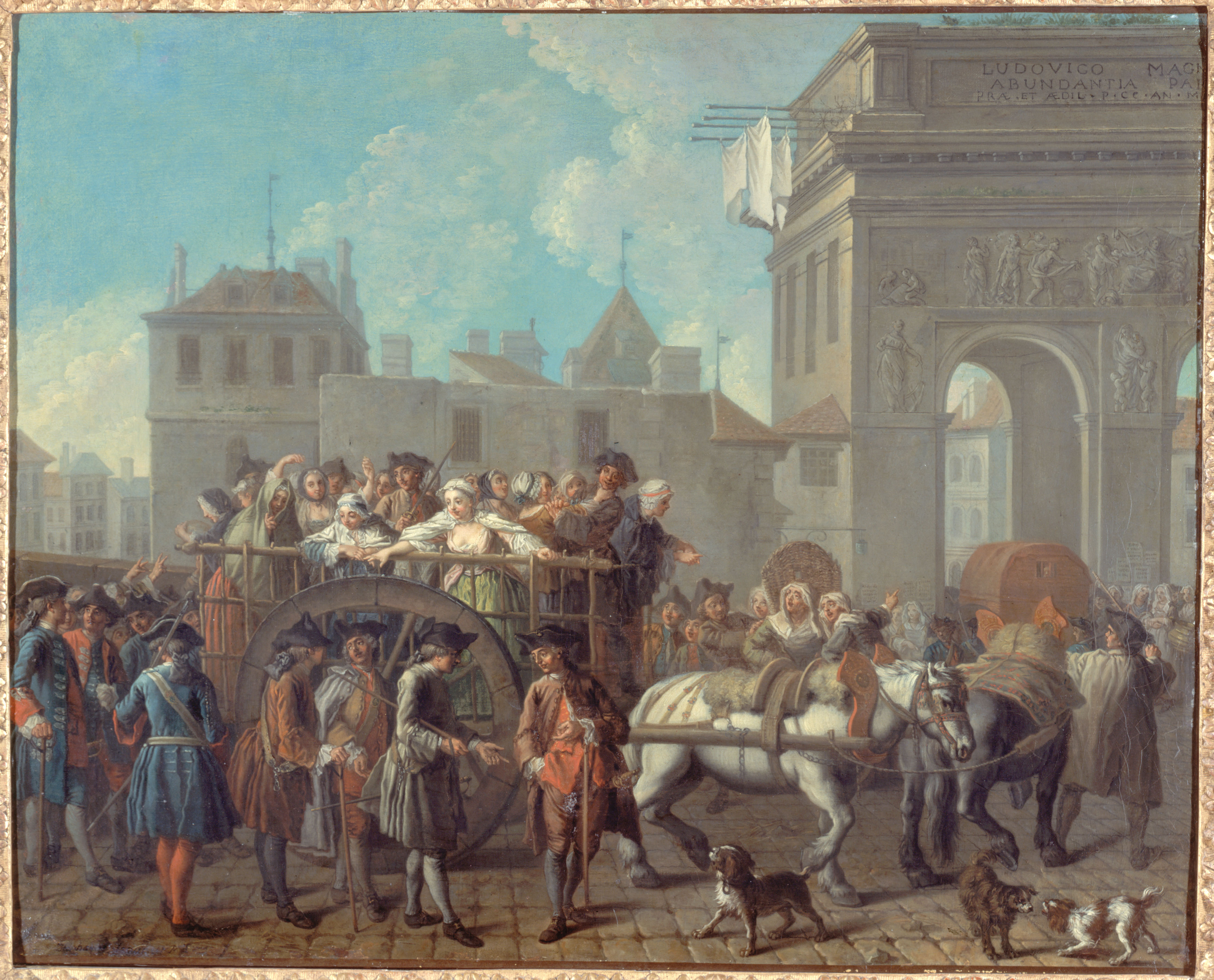
The girls of pleasure at Salpétrière driven through the Porte St-Bernard

After returning to Paris, Jearat became a member of the Royal Academy in 1733. In 1737, he first exhibited at the Salon des Artistes at the Louvre, then not a museum but a palace. He continued to exhibit his work on a regular basis there until 1789. At the Academy, Jeaurat was elevated to professor (1737) and chancellor (1781). He was the guardian of the king's collection of paintings in Versailles from 1767.

He died in 1789 in Versailles.

== Work ==
Jeaurat achieved considerable success with his historical and mythological works, his portraits and still lifes, often emulating the style of Chardin. But it was above all his genre paintings which attracted interest. In particular, his conversation pieces in the style of David Teniers the Younger ensured his popularity. He was in his time referred to as the 'French Teniers'.

He was adept at painting lively scenes in the streets of Paris such as The girls of pleasure at Salpétrière driven through the Porte St-Bernard (1755) showing prostitutes being transported to the Salpétrière prison. He also painted a series of eight works depicting scenes from La Fontaine's fables as well as religious works.

== Selected works ==
- Laban Searching his Daughters (1737), Oil on canvas, 15x33 cm, Hermitage Museum

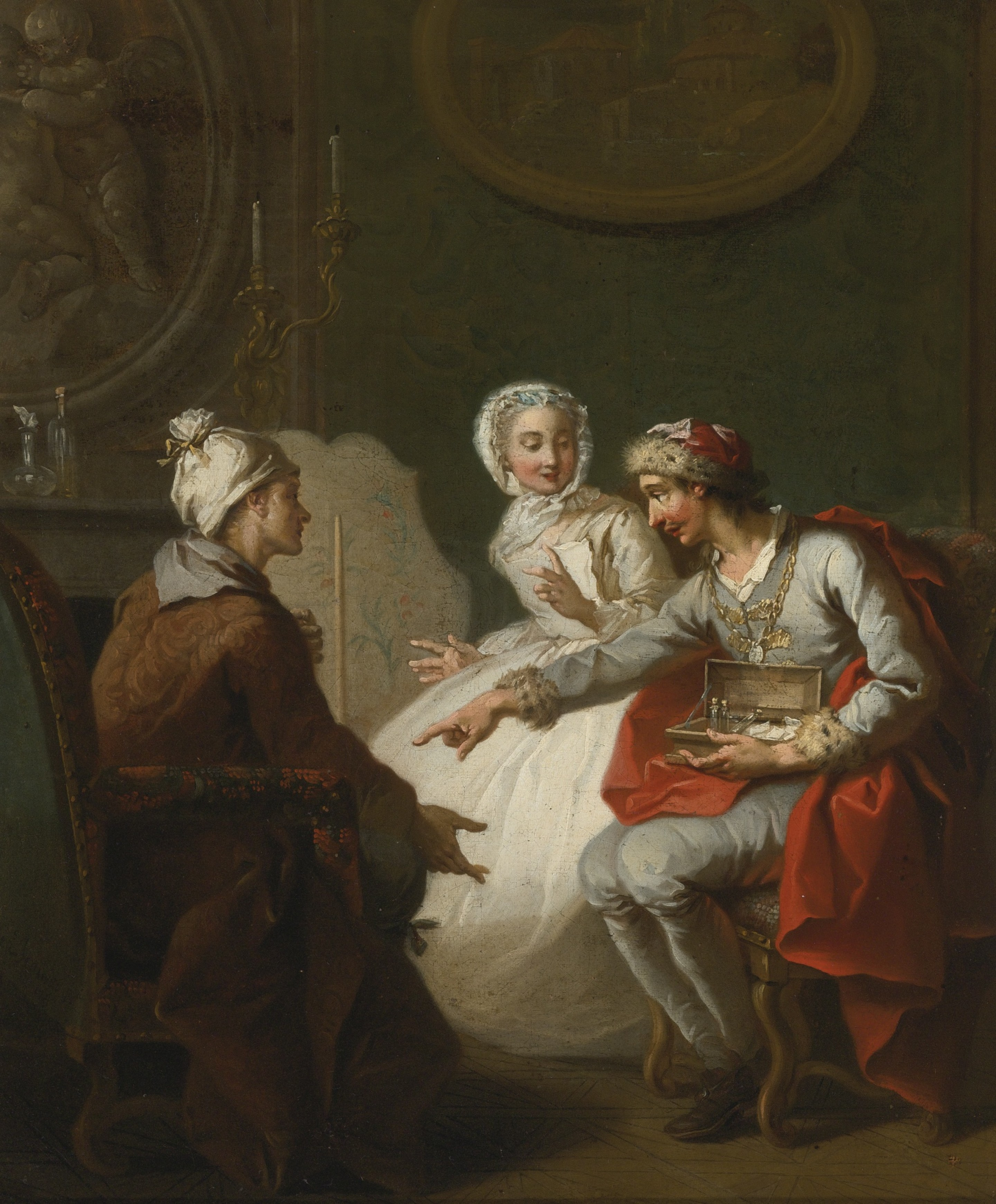
The doctor's visit, or the charlatan

- Recovering (1744), Oil on canvas, 43.5x32.5 cm, Hermitage Museum
- Interior with two Women (c 1740), Oil on canvas; 61 x 51 cm, Ashmolean Museum.
- Bath o Women (1741), Oil on canvas, 64.5 x 52,5 cm, Musée de Bordeaux.
- The girls of pleasure at Salpétrière driven through the Porte St-Bernard (1755), Musée Carnavalet
