= Vermenton =

- Commune
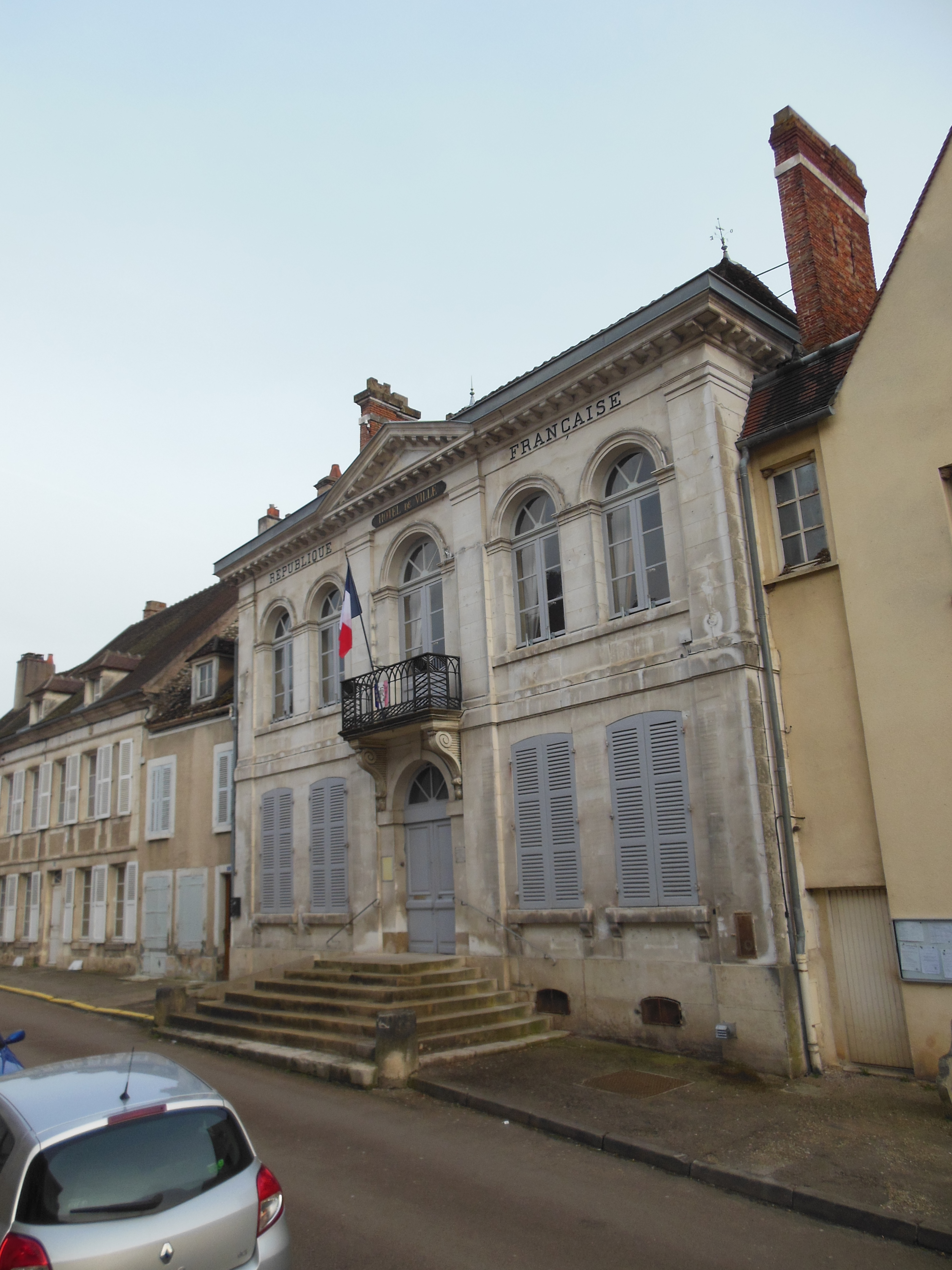
- The town hall in Vermenton

- Coat of arms
- Location of Vermenton
- Location within France Location within Bourgogne-Franche-Comté
- Coordinates: 47°39′57″N 3°44′10″E
- Country: France
- Region: Bourgogne-Franche-Comté
- Department: Yonne
- Arrondissement: Auxerre
- Canton: Joux-la-Ville

Government
  - Mayor (2020–2026): Jean-Dominique Franck
- Area^{1}: 53.34 km^{2} (20.59 sq mi)
- Highest elevation: 263 m (863 ft)
- Lowest elevation: 112 m (367 ft)
- Population (2023): 1,303
  - Density: 24.43/km^{2} (63.27/sq mi)
- Time zone: UTC+01:00 (CET)
  - Summer (DST): UTC+02:00 (CEST)
- INSEE/Postal code: 89441 /89270
- ^{1} French Land Register data, which excludes lakes, ponds, glaciers > 1 km^{2} (0.386 sq mi or 247 acres) and river estuaries.

Vermenton (French pronunciation: [vɛʁmɑ̃tɔ̃]) is a commune in the Yonne department in Bourgogne-Franche-Comté in north-central France. On 1 January 2016, the former commune of Sacy was merged into Vermenton. The remains of the former Cistercian Reigny Abbey are situated here.

== See also ==
- Communes of the Yonne department
