= Saint Louis Handing Over the Regency to His Mother =

Painting by Joseph-Marie Vien

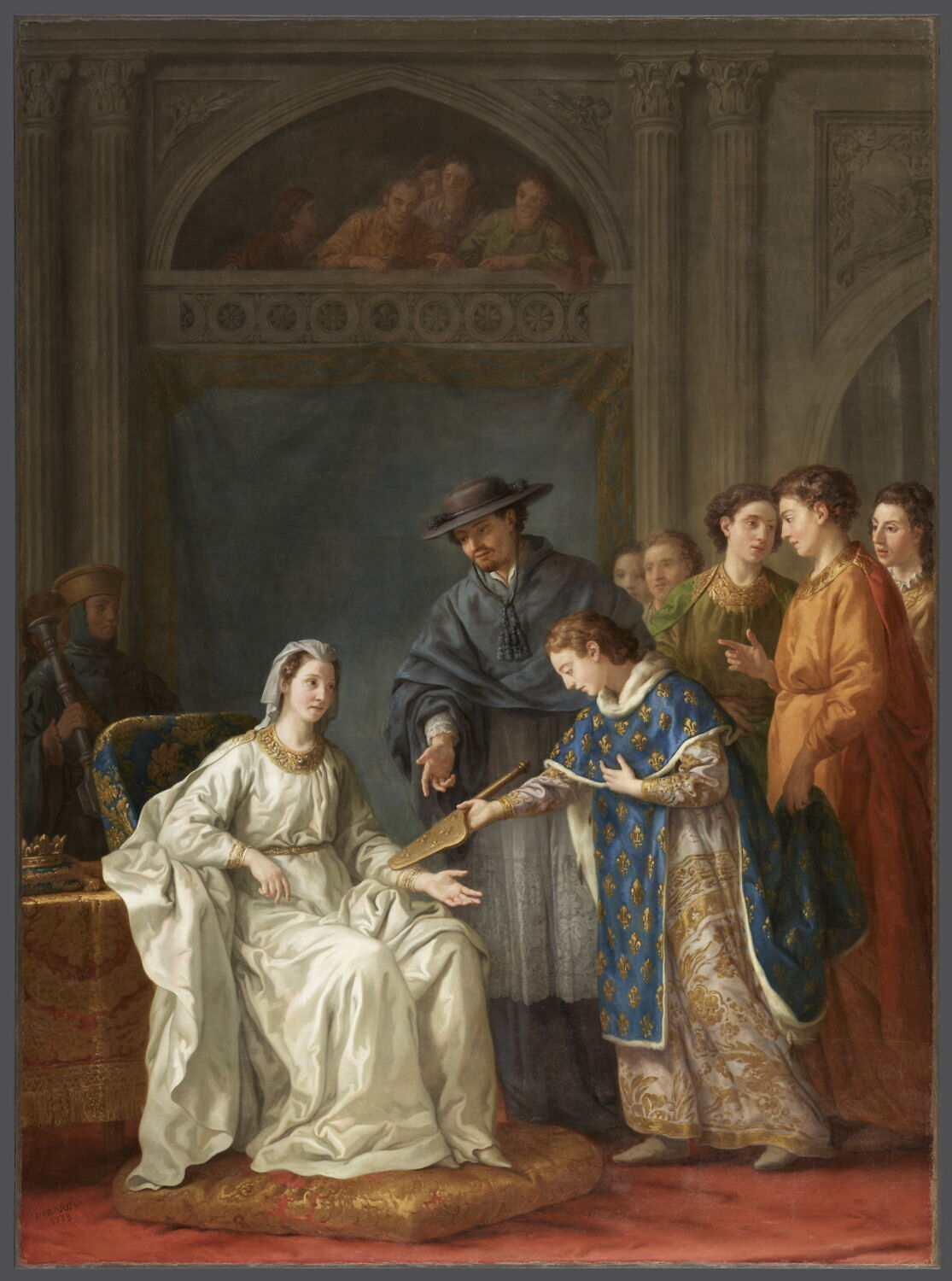
- Artist: Joseph-Marie Vien
- Year: 1773
- Medium: Oil on canvas
- Dimensions: 289 cm × 214 cm (114 in × 84 in)
- Location: Saint-Louis Chapel, Paris

Saint Louis Handing Over the Regency to His Mother (French: Saint Louis, à son avènement à la couronne, remet à la Reine Blanche de Castille, sa mère, la Régence du Royaume) is an oil on canvas history painting by the French artist Joseph-Marie Vien, from 1773. The work is in the collection of the Louvre, but has been on long term loan to the Chapel of the École Militair in Paris since 1934.

== History and description ==
It depicts the young Louis IX investing the Regency of France to his mother Blanche of Castile during a dispute in 1228. Louis would later attain sainthood after leading the Seventh Crusade. It was part of the project of patriotic themes that grew more prominent in French art over the following years when the Count of Angiviller became head of the administration.

It was part of a large commission for series of eleven works for the chapel of the École Militaire. Vien was assigned this subject by Jean-Baptiste Marie Pierre, the Premier peintre du Roi. The painting was displayed at the Salon of 1773 at the Louvre in Paris. Seized at the time of the French Revolution, it is now in the collection of the Louvre. After a number of different homes including Saint-Cyr, in 1934 it was returned to be hung at the École Militaire.

== Bibliography ==
- Gaehtgens, Thomas W. & Lugand, Jacques. Joseph-Marie Vien: peintre du roi. Arthena, 1988.
- Levey, Michael. Painting and Sculpture in France, 1700-1789. Yale University Press, 1993.
