= Saint-Louis Chapel, Paris =

Saint-Louis Chapel, École Militaire
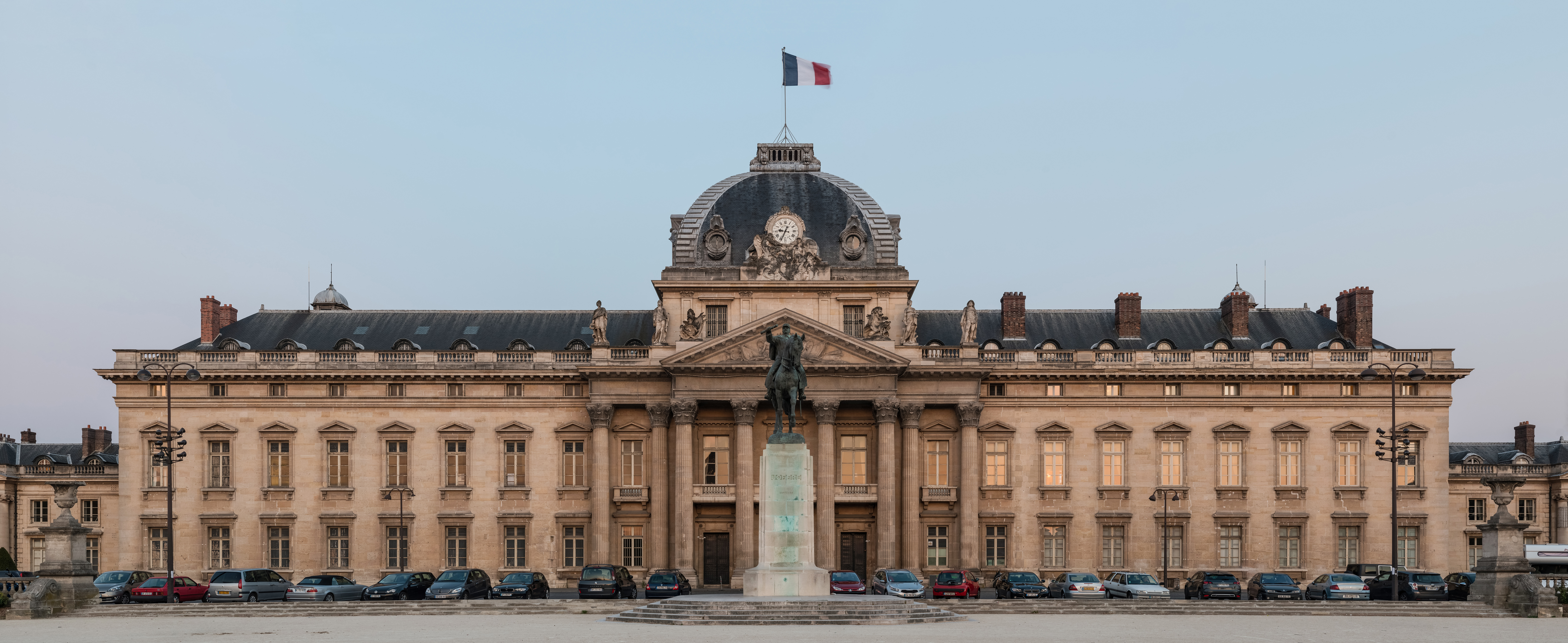
- Central École building, containing the chapel
- Interactive map of the Saint-Louis Chapel, École Militaire area

General information
- Type: military academy chapel
- Location: 13 Place de Joffre, 75007, Paris, Île-de-France, France
- Coordinates: 48°51′09″N 2°18′13″E
- Completed: 1769-1773

Design and construction
- Architect: Ange-Jacques Gabriel

Website
- www.dioceseauxarmees,catholique.fr

Saint-Louis Chapel is the chapel of the Ecole Militaire, the French Military Academy in Paris. It is located at 13 Place Joffre, in the 7th arrondissement of Paris. It is dedicated to Saint Louis, the patron saint of the Army. It is open to the public only during the European Heritage Days

== History ==
The chapel proposal was strongly supported by the Marquise de Pompadour, the official mistress of the King. The assignment was given in 1751 to the chief royal architect,Ange-Jacques Gabriel, but there were financial difficulties and delays. The first stone was laid by King Louis XV in 1769, but it was not completed until 1773.

Napoleon Bonaparte, was a student in the military academy from 1785 to 186, and received his confirmation the chapel.

During the French Revolution, the chapel was closed, looted, and in 1793 it was turned into a dining hall and ballroom. In 1795, Napoleon repossessed the building and made it his headquarters. The chapel was renovated, and the remains of Joseph Joffre, French army commander and prominent figure of the First World War, were honored there after his death in 1930.

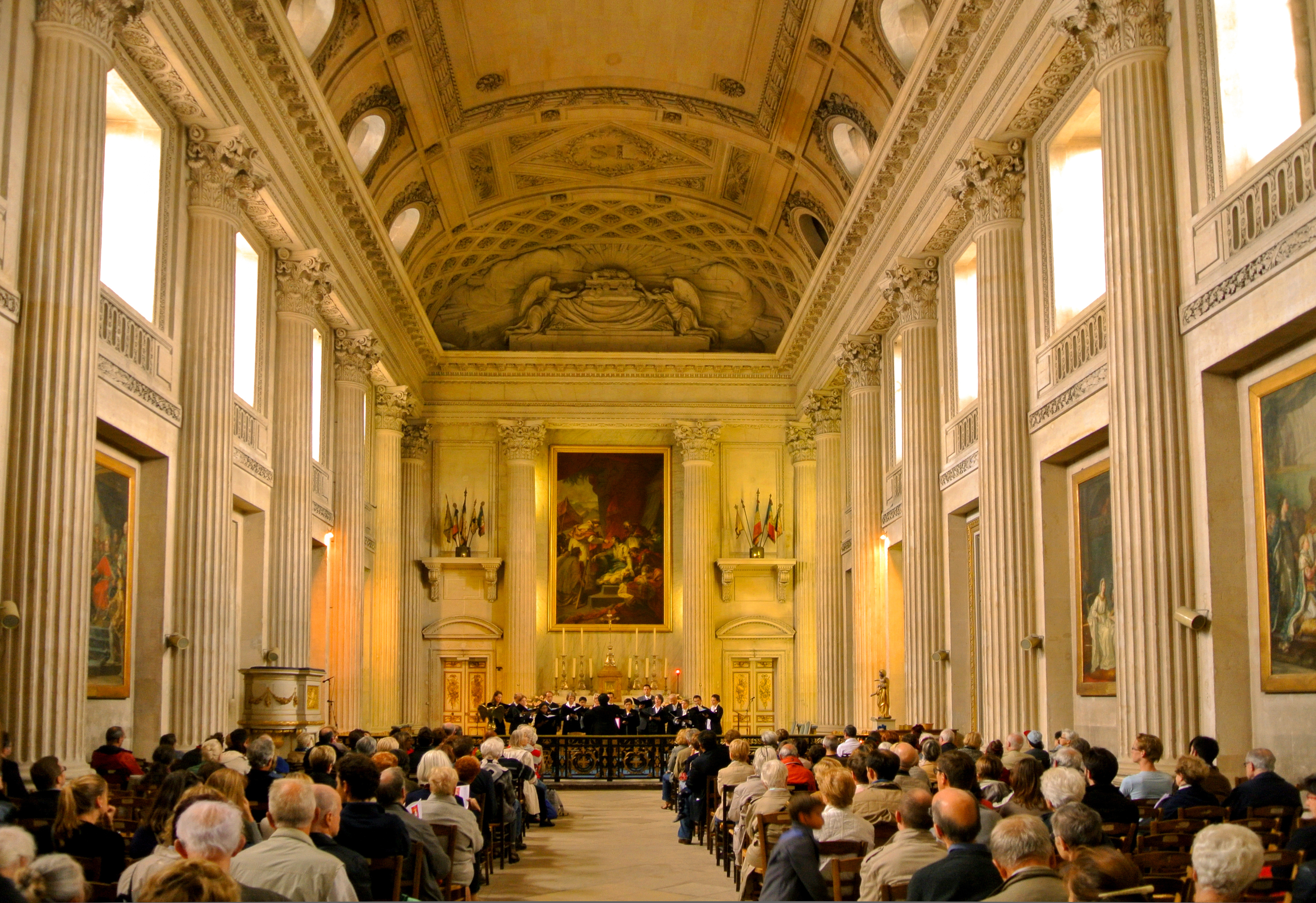
Chapel interior

== Art and Decoration ==
The chapel has a remarkable collection of eleven paintings illustrating scenes from the life of Saint Louis. These were commissioned from the leading French artists of the time, all members of the French Academy of the Arts, selected by Jean-Baptiste Pierre (1714–1789), the official painter of the King. He assigned painters for each scene of a selected series of events. They were all displayed together for the first time at the Salon of 1773.

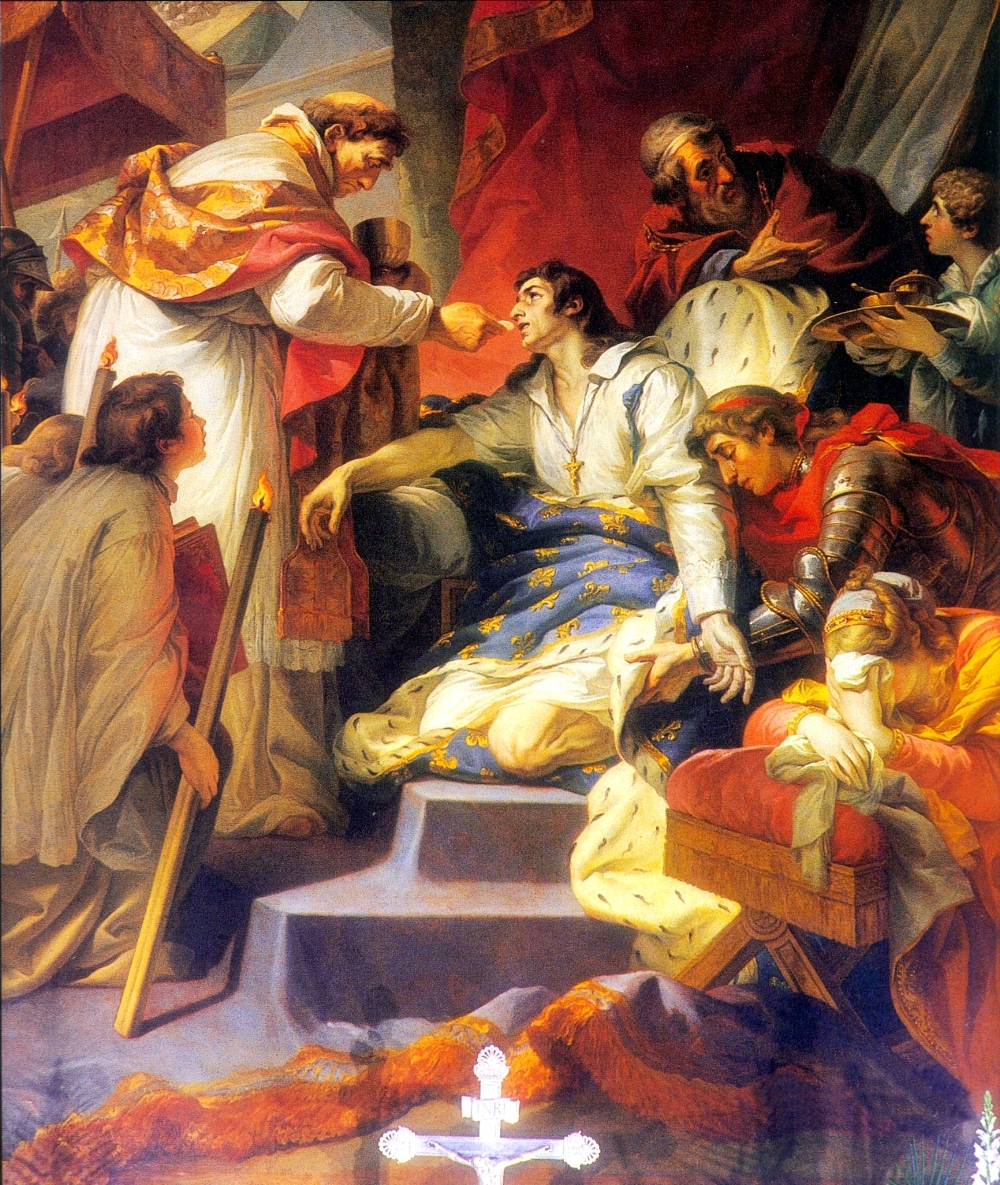
"The Last Communion of Saint Louis", by Gabriel-Francois Doyen

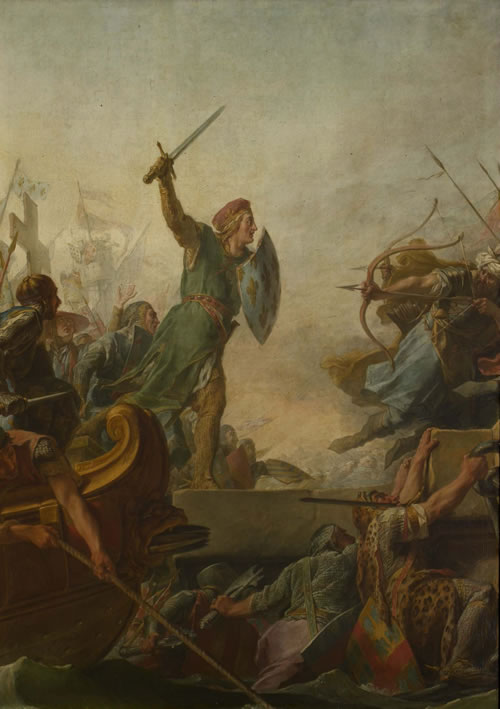
"The Descent of King Saint Louis at Tunis" by Jean-Bernard Restout

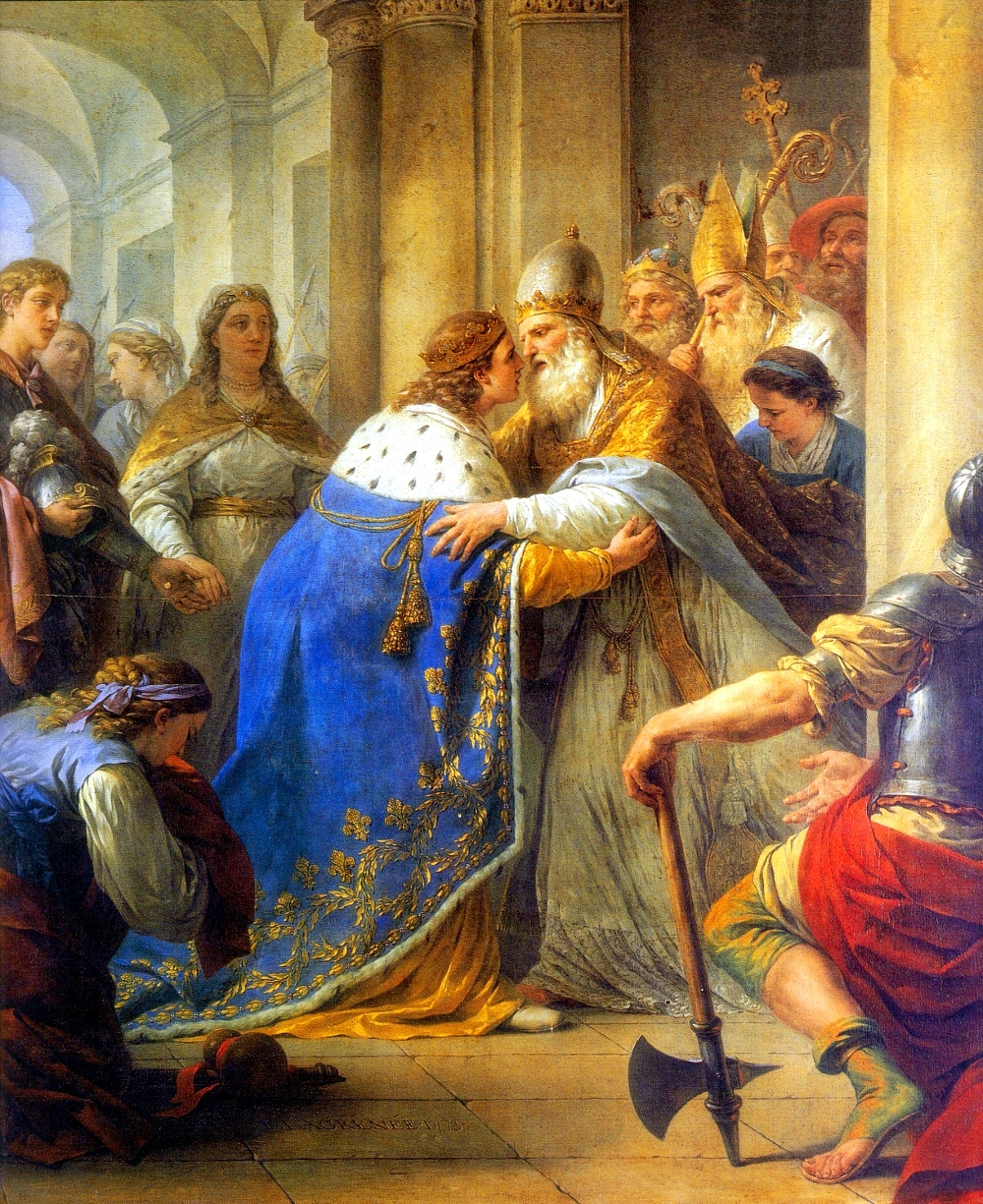
"Meeting of Saint Louis and Pope Innocent IV", by Louis Jean Francois Lagrenee

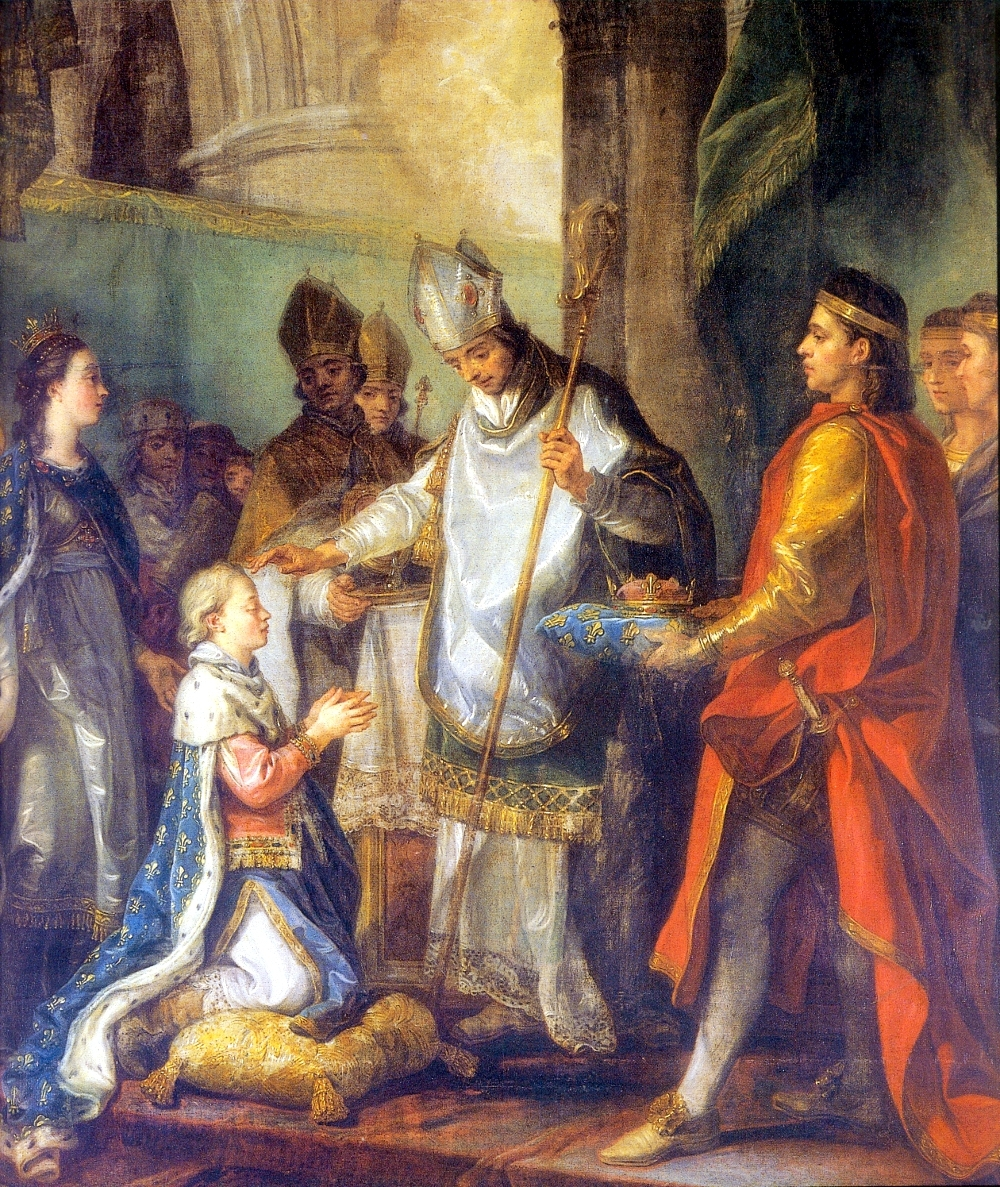
"The Coronation of Saint Louis", by Charles-André van Loo
