= Marie-Thérèse Reboul =

French artist (1735–1806)

Marie-Thérèse Reboul-Vien
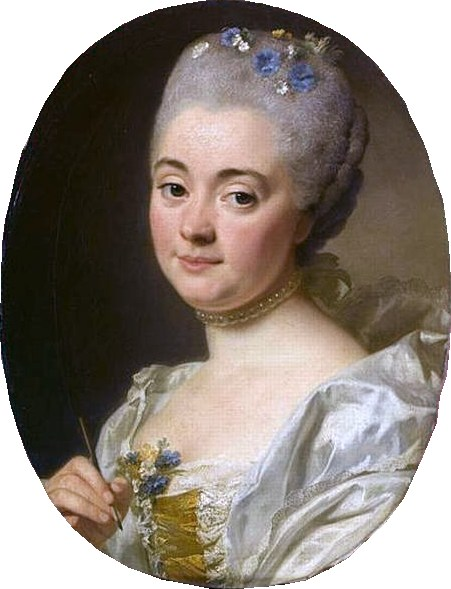
- Marie-Thérèse Reboul-Vien (1757) by Alexander Roslin
- Born: 26 February 1735; Paris, France
- Died: 4 July 1806 (aged 71); Paris, France
- Known for: Painting, engraving
- Notable work: Two Pigeons on a Tree Branch (1762)
- Spouse: Joseph-Marie Vien (m. 1757)
- Children: Joseph-Marie Vien the young

Marie-Thérèse Reboul (26 February 1735 – 4 January 1806), commonly called Madame Vien, was a French painter and engraver of natural history subjects, still lifes, and flowers.

In 1757, Marie-Thérèse Reboul married the painter Joseph-Marie Vien, who was nineteen years older. Nineteenth-century sources state that she was taught by her husband, but Joseph-Marie Vien's autobiography does not mention it. She may have been a student of Madeleine Françoise Basseporte. Prior to her marriage, Reboul-Vien engraved specimens for Sénégal: Coquillages (1757) by the French naturalist Michel Adanson and Dissertation sur le papyrus (1758) by the French antiquarian Anne Claude de Caylus.

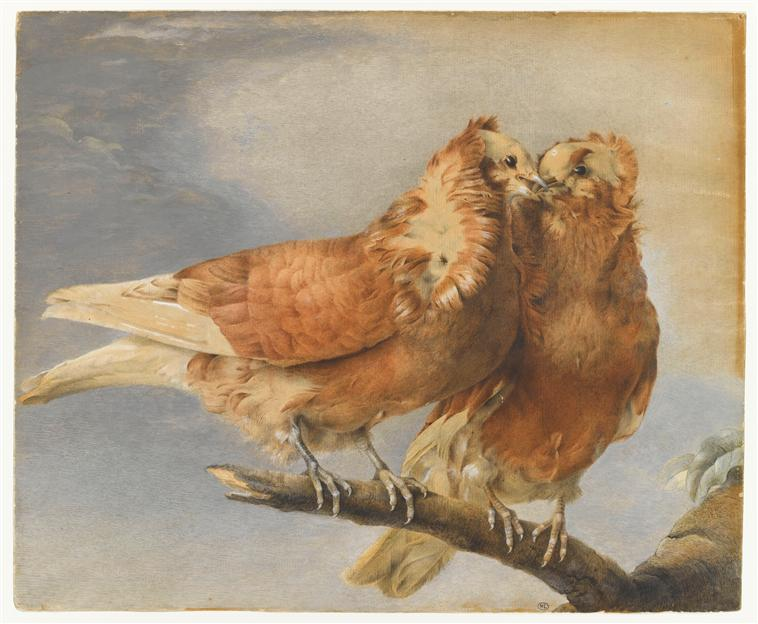
Two Pigeons on a Tree Branch, 1762

Reboul-Vien was one of only fifteen women to be accepted as full academicians in the 145-year history of the Académie royale de peinture et de sculpture in Paris. She was admitted in 1757, the same year in which she married Joseph-Marie Vien. It had been 37 years since the last woman, Rosalba Carriera, became an academician. Reboul-Vien's husband was a prominent member of the Académie, which likely led to her acceptance. At the time, Reboul-Vien was described as "a painter of miniatures and gouaches specializing in flowers, butterflies and birds." Her reception piece was Two Pigeons Pigeons on a Tree Branch, which she submitted to the Académie in 1762.

She exhibited her works at the Salons of 1757, 1759, 1763, 1765, and 1767. These included watercolors of a hen with her chicks, a kestrel killing a small bird, a golden pheasant from China, a brooding pigeon, and a bird of prey following a butterfly. At the Salon of 1767, Denis Diderot praised A Crested Hen Watching over Her Chicks as a "very handsome small painting" that was "painted with great vigor and coloristic truth ... Everything's right, including the bits of straw scattered around the hen." He concluded, more critically, "I'm surprised by her hen; I didn't think she was this accomplished." Even so, reviews of Reboul-Vien's works were mostly positive. Several of her works were acquired by Catherine the Great. By the late the nineteenth century, few of her watercolors could be located.
