= The École de Chirurgie Under Construction =

Painting by Hubert Robert

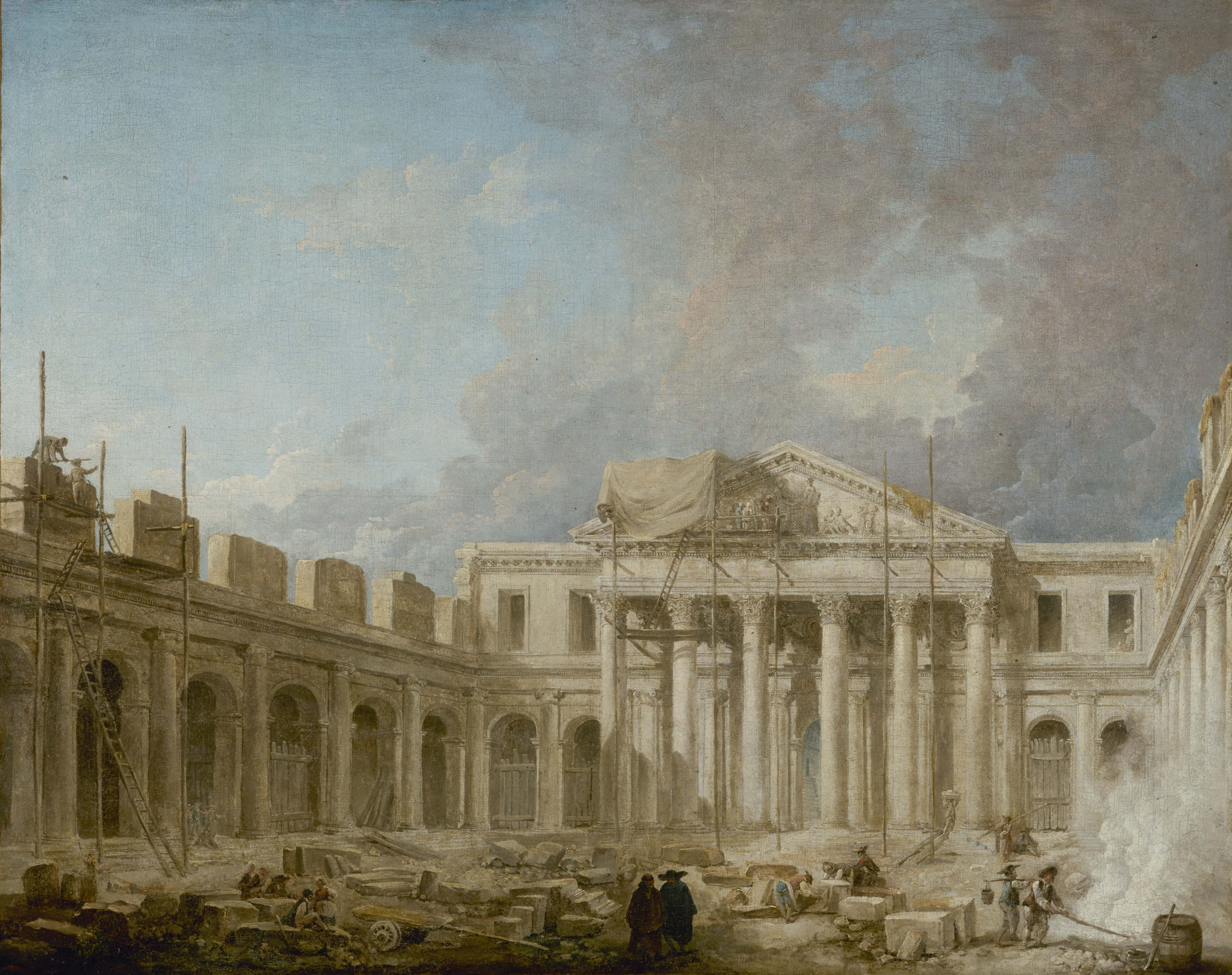
- Artist: Hubert Robert
- Year: 1773
- Type: Oil on canvas, landscape painting
- Dimensions: 64.5 cm × 80 cm (25.4 in × 31 in)
- Location: Musée Carnavalet, Paris

The École de Chirurgie Under Construction (French: L'Ecole de chirurgie en construction) is a 1773 oil painting by the French artist Hubert Robert. It depicts the École de Chirurgie, the new School of Surgery, being built in Paris. During the latter stages of the reign of Louis XV, the old Collège de Bourgogne was demolished to make way for the new Neoclassical building designed by Jacques Gondouin. Robert's painting shows the new building with scaffolding and resembles the classical ruins he painted of Rome.

The painting was displayed at the Salon of 1773 at the Louvre in Paris. Today it is in the collection of the city's Musée Carnavalet, having been acquired in 1986.

== Bibliography ==
- Dubin, Nina L. Futures & Ruins: Eighteenth-century Paris and the Art of Hubert Robert. Getty Publications, 2010.
