= Salon of 1773 =

1773 art exhibition in Paris

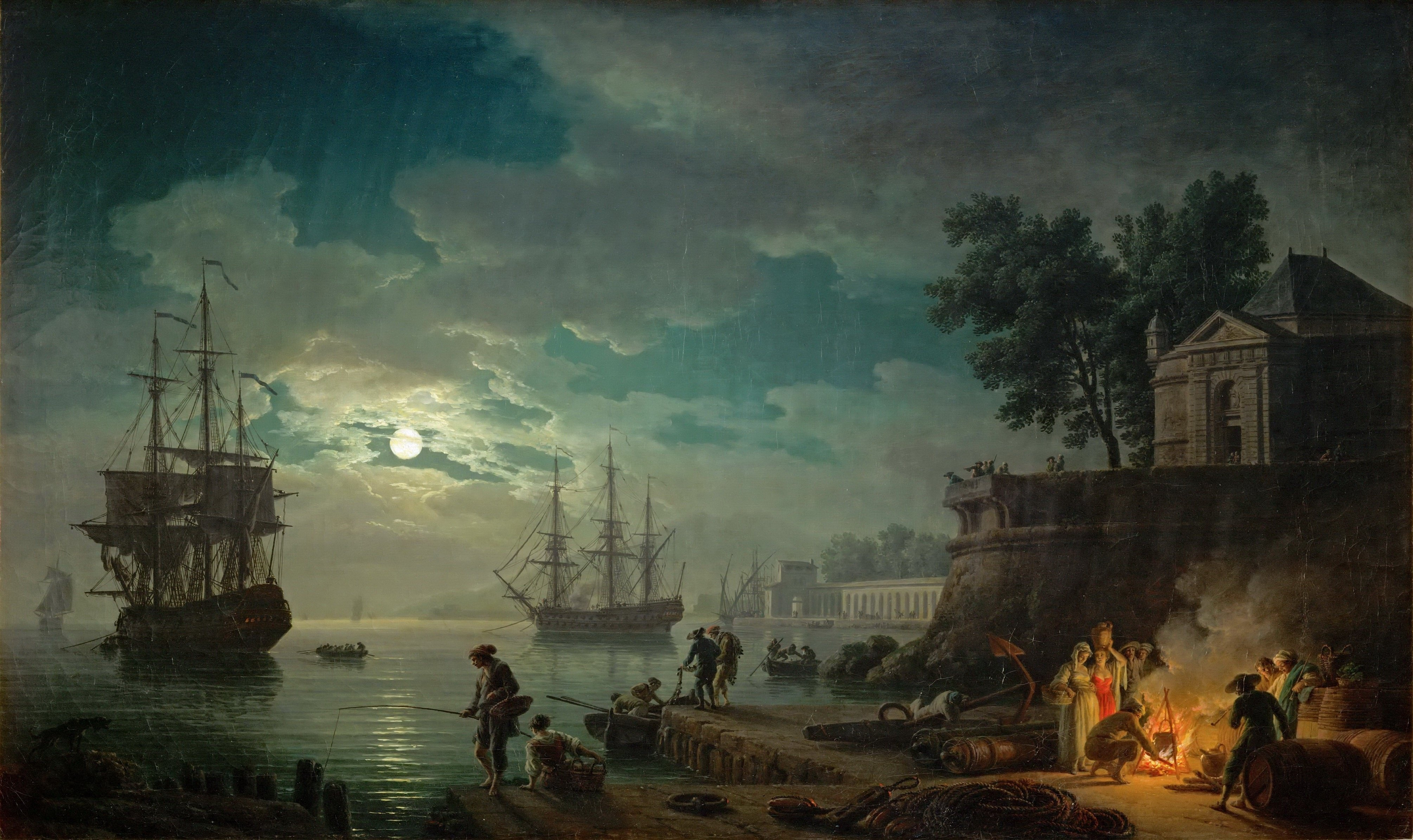
Seaport by Moonlight by Claude-Joseph Vernet

The Salon of 1773 was an art exhibition held at the Louvre in Paris. Part of the regular series of Salons organised by the Académie Royale, it ran from 25 August to 25 September 1773. It was the last to take place during the reign of Louis XV.

Stylistically the previously dominant rococo was being challenged by the emerging Neoclassicism. Joseph-Marie Vien, generally considered one of the pioneers of Neoclassicism, exhibited a varied selection of paintings. Amongst his submissions was the history painting Saint Louis Handing Over the Regency to His Mother.

Claude-Joseph Vernet submitted the expressive landscape painting Seaport by Moonlight, one of a series of four pictures commissioned by the royal mistress Madame du Barry, depicting different times of the day. The sculptor Jean-Antoine Houdon displayed several works acquired by Catherine the Great. Drawing close to the end of his career the genre painter Jean Siméon Chardin exhibited Woman Drawing Water from a Water Urn, a version of a work he had originally displayed at the Salon of 1737.

== Gallery ==
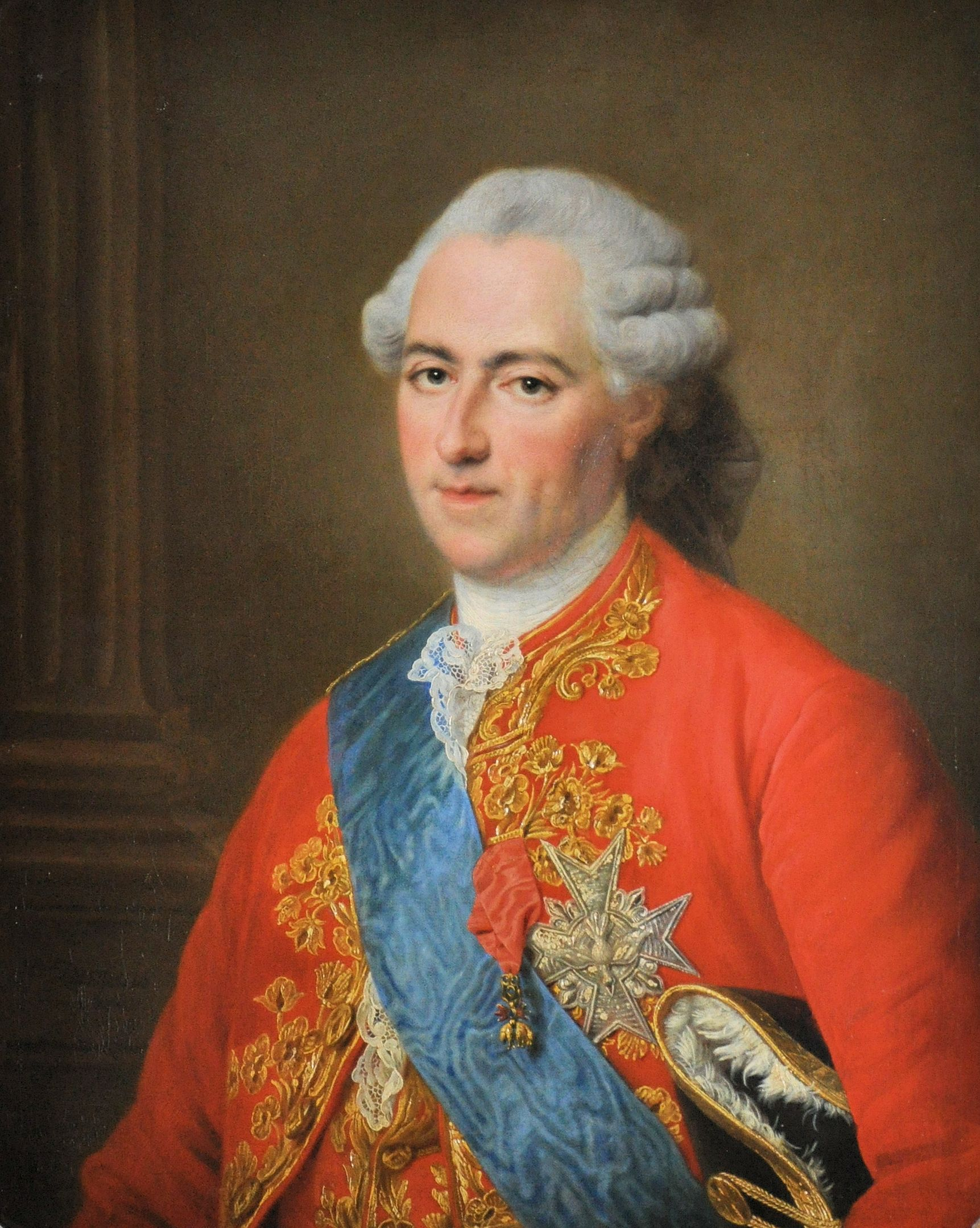
Portrait of Louis XVI by François-Hubert Drouais

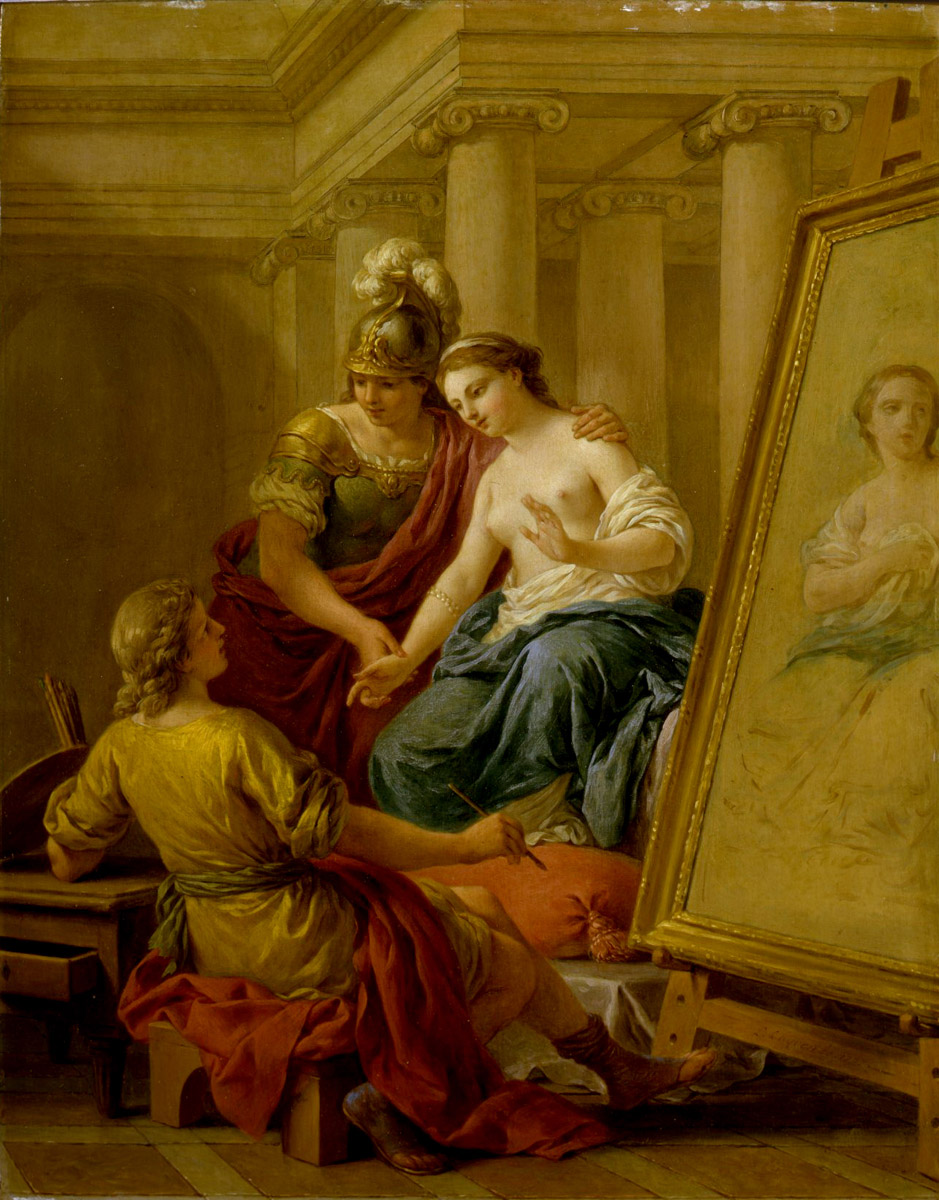
Apelles in Love with Alexander's Mistress by Louis-Jean-François Lagrenée

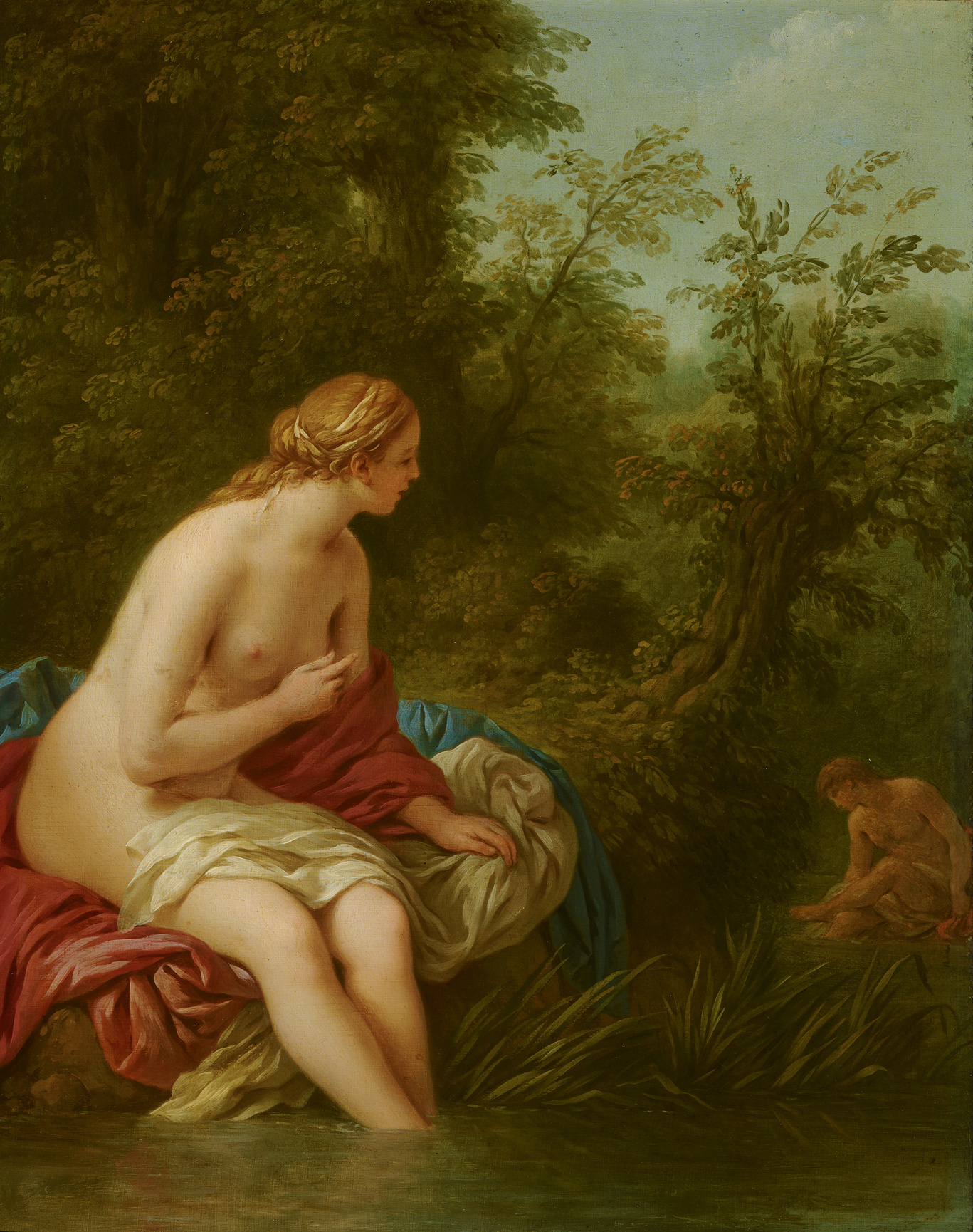
Landscape with Salmacis and Hermaphroditus by Louis-Jean-François Lagrenée

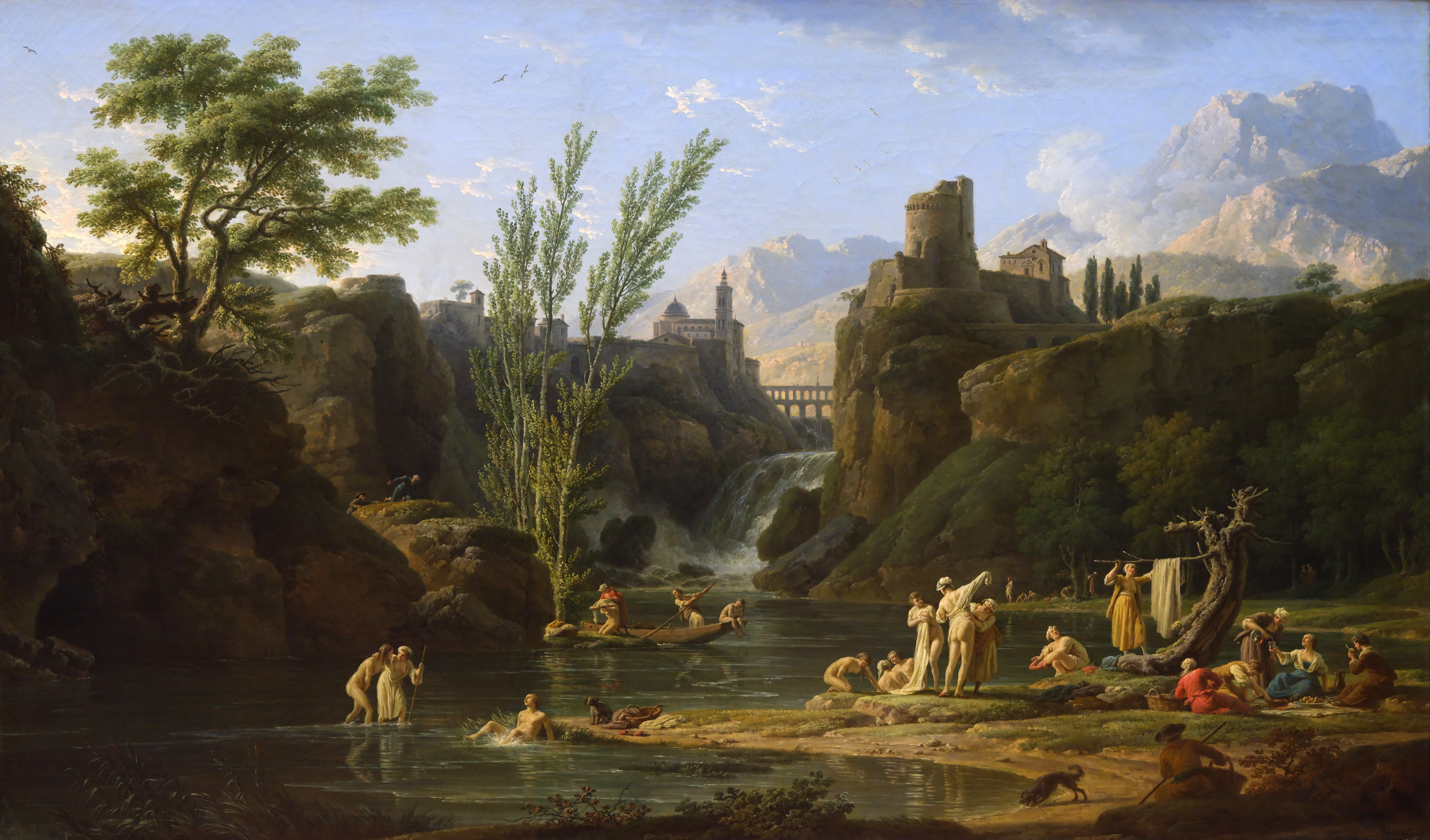
Morning, The Bathers by Claude-Joseph Vernet

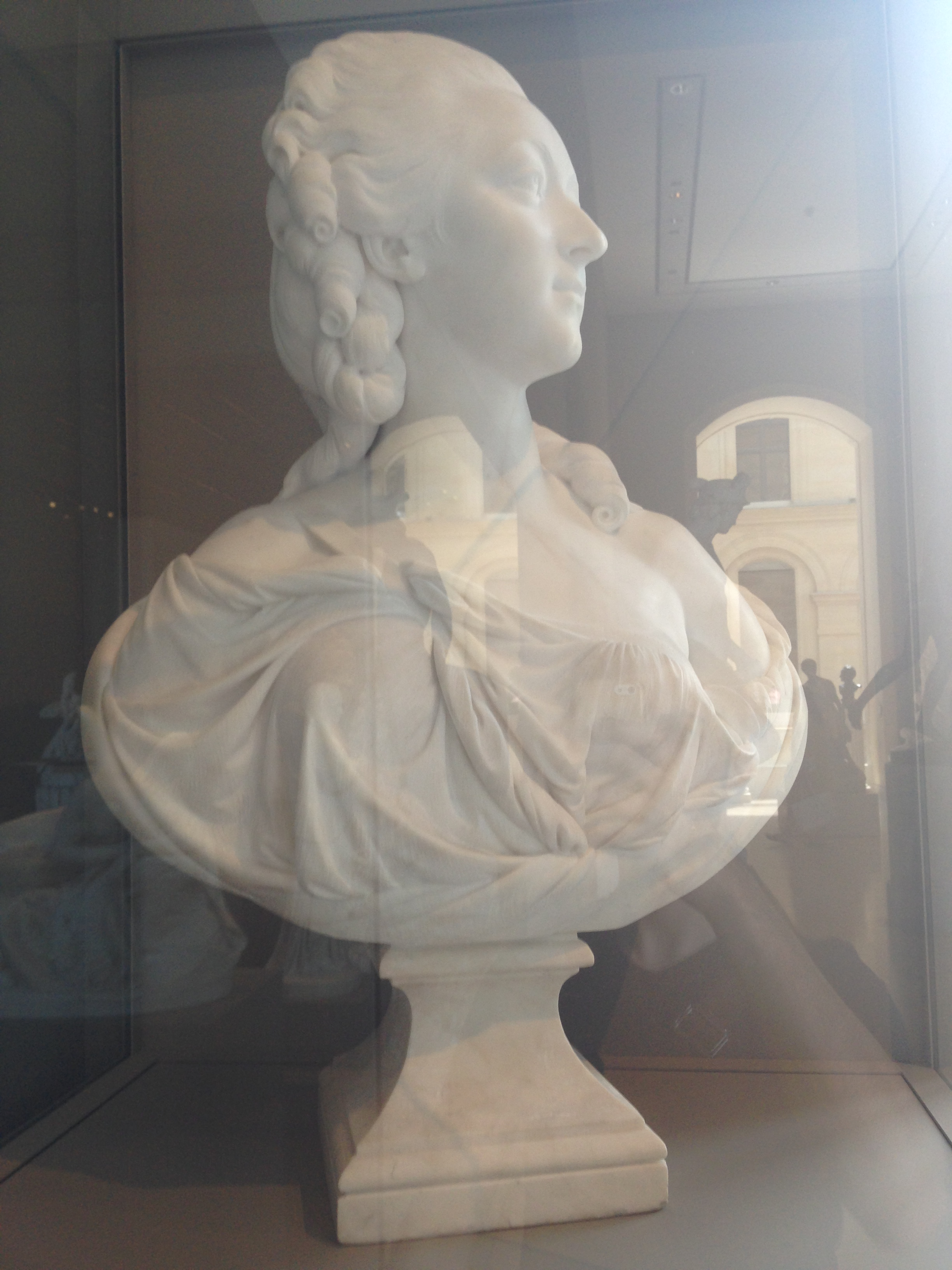
Madame du Barry by Augustin Pajou

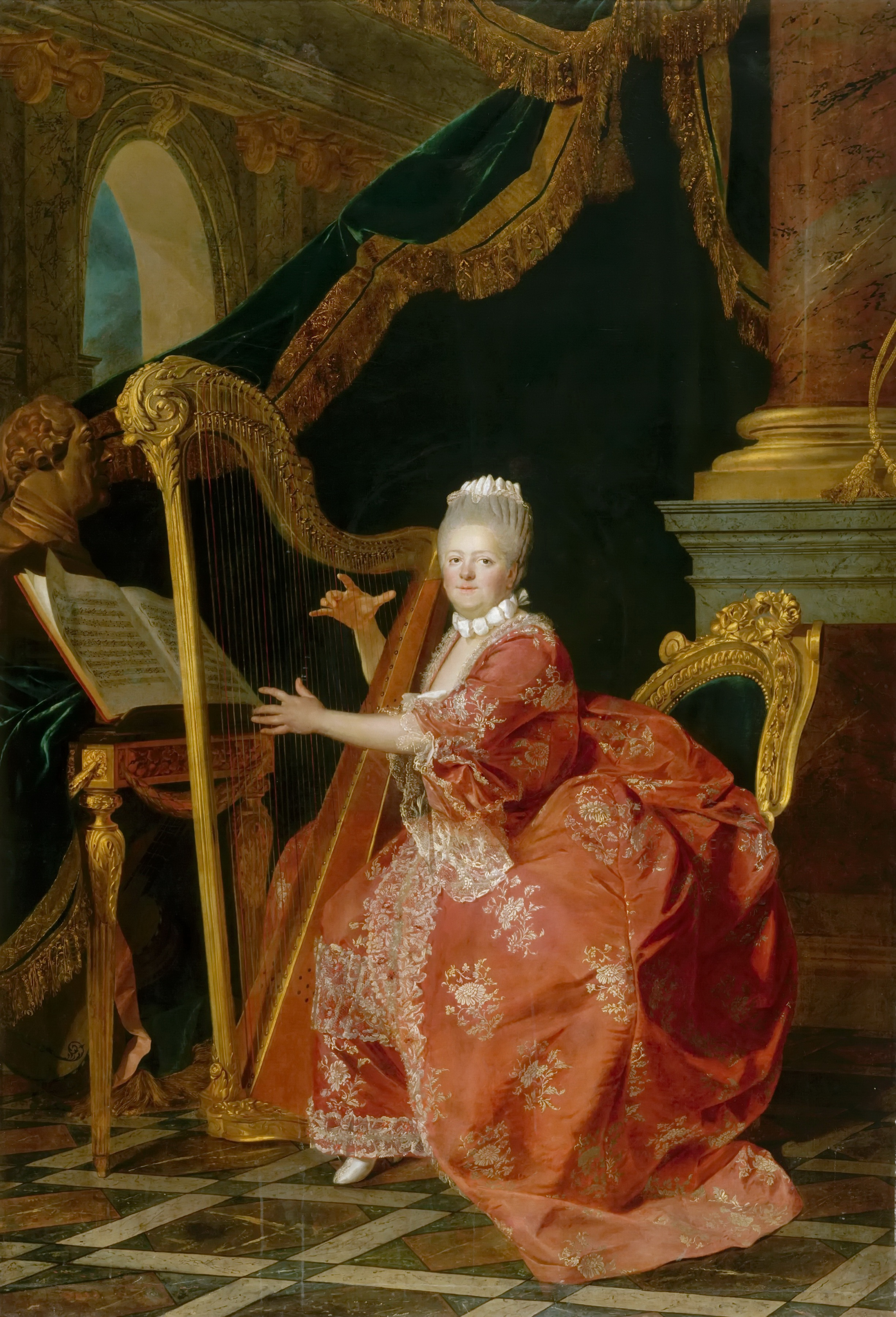
Portrait of Victoire of France by Étienne Aubry

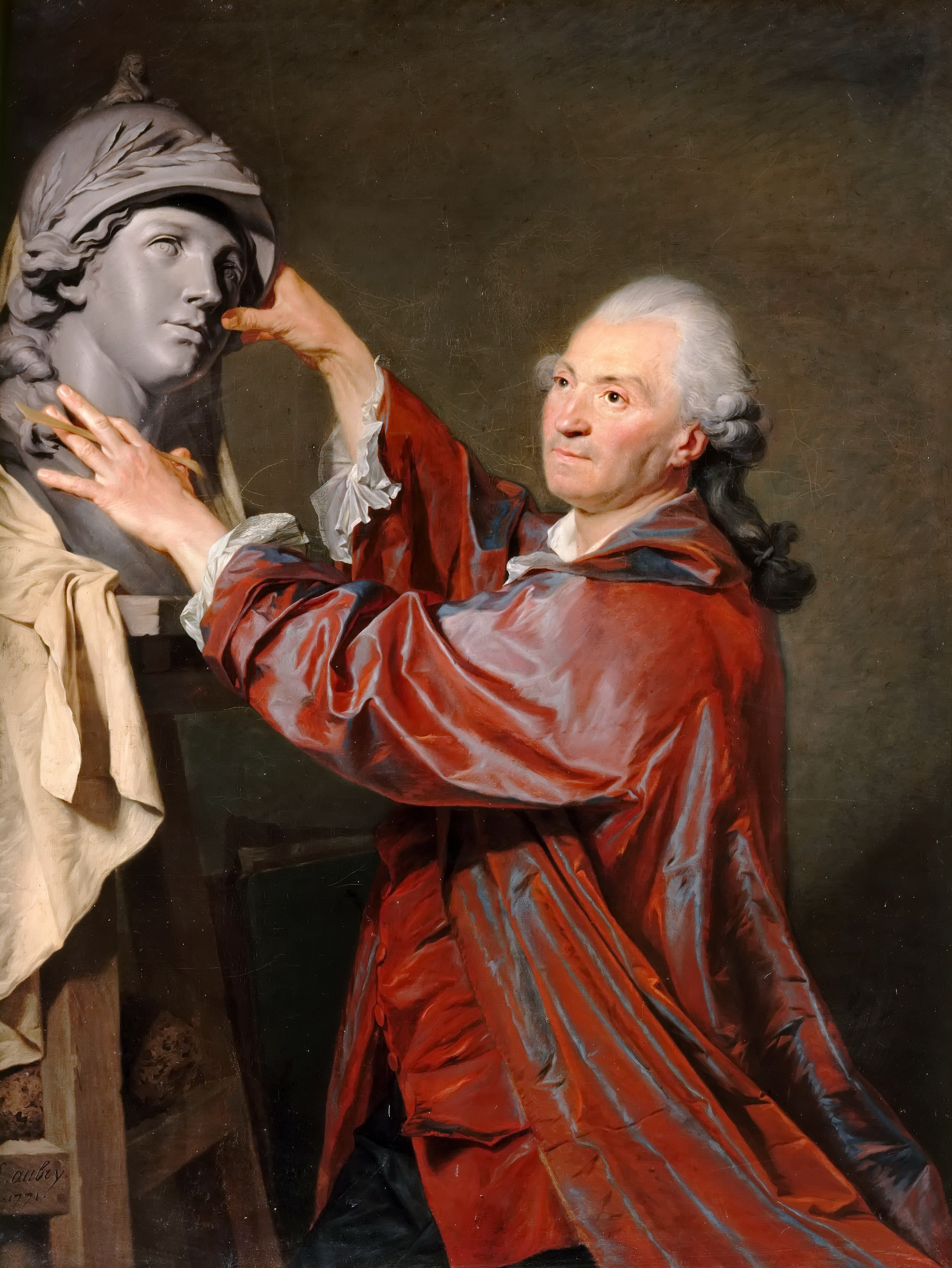
Portrait of Louis-Claude Vassé by Étienne Aubry

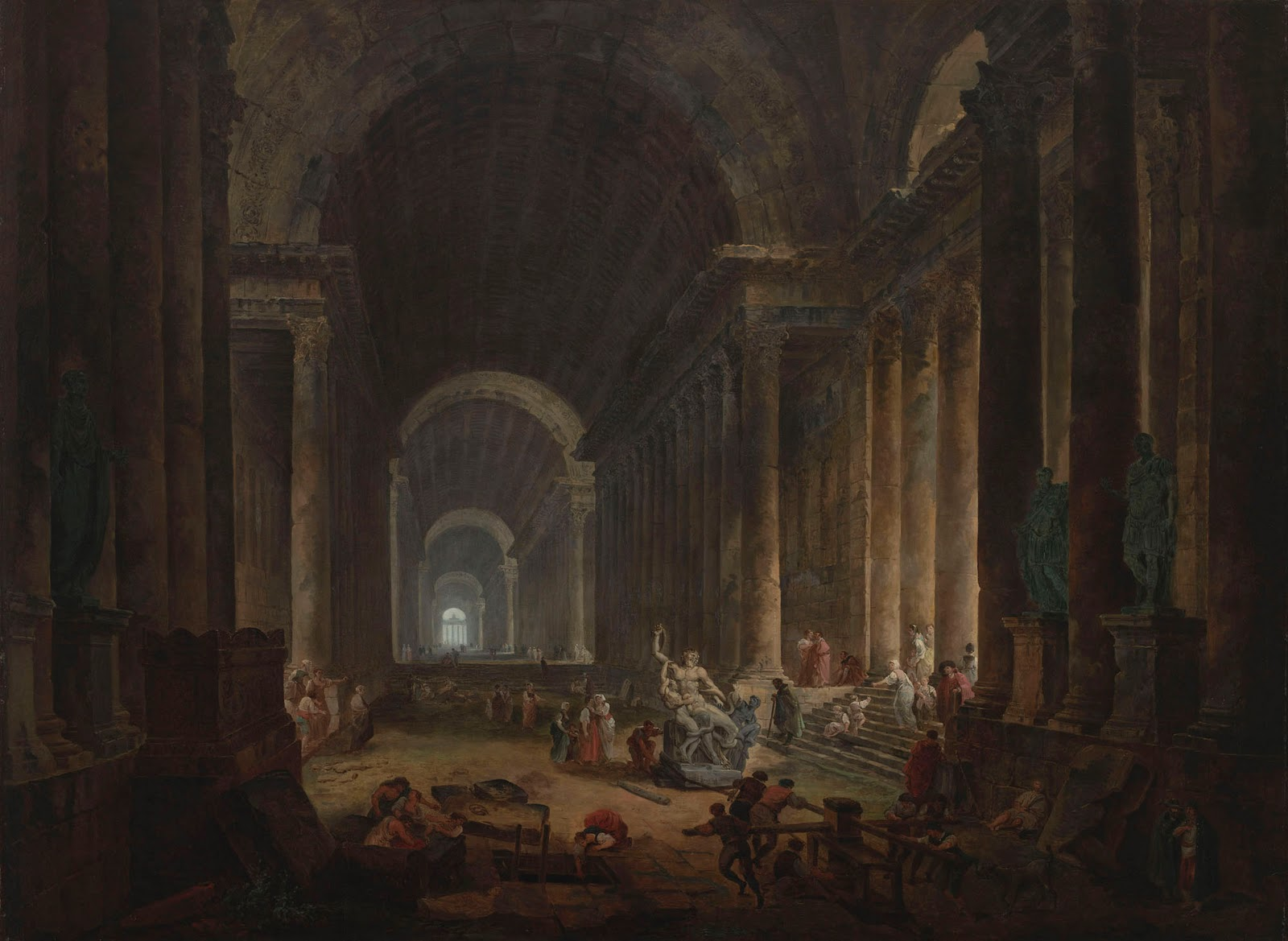
Finding of the Laocoon by Hubert Robert

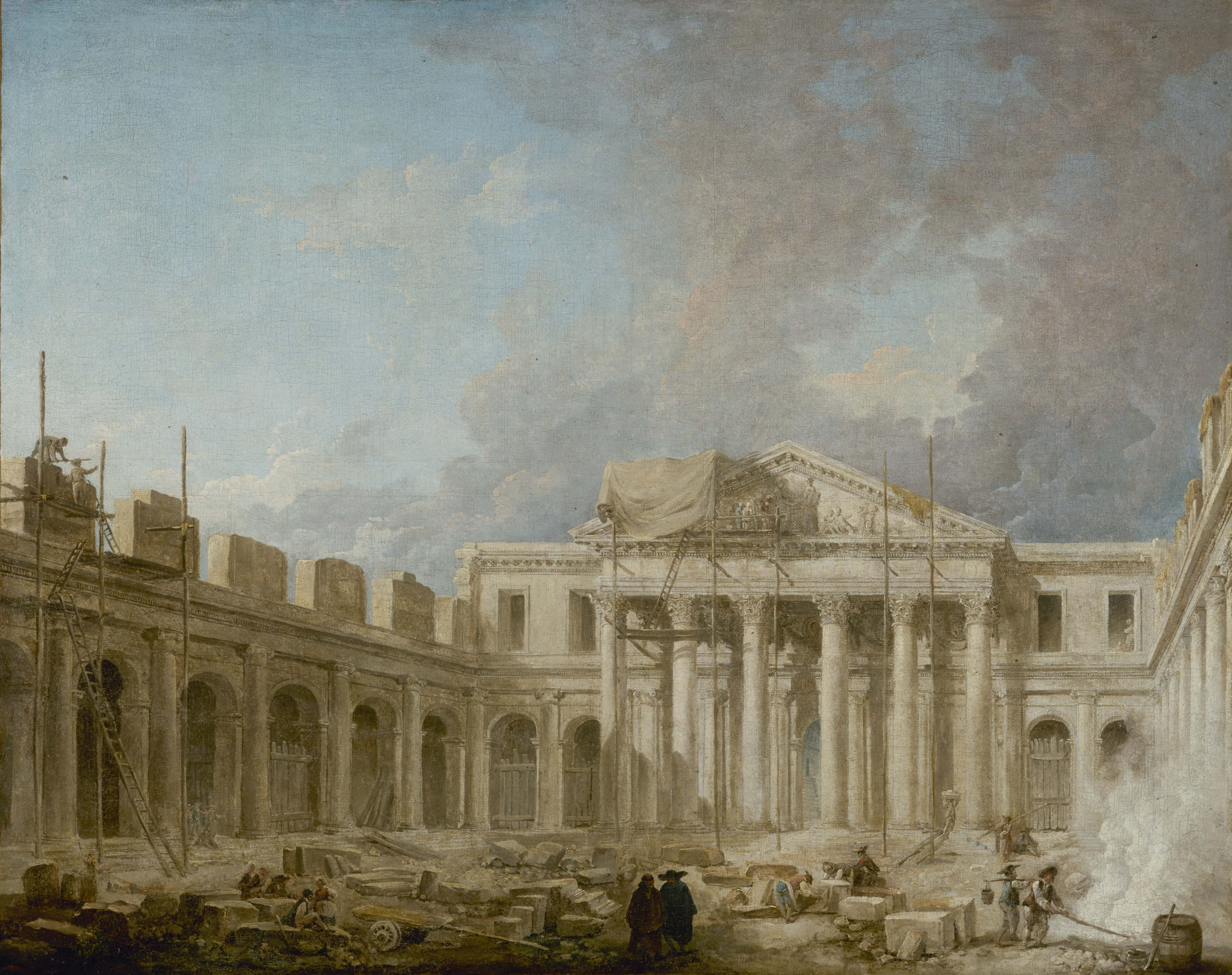
The École de Chirurgie Under Construction by Hubert Robert

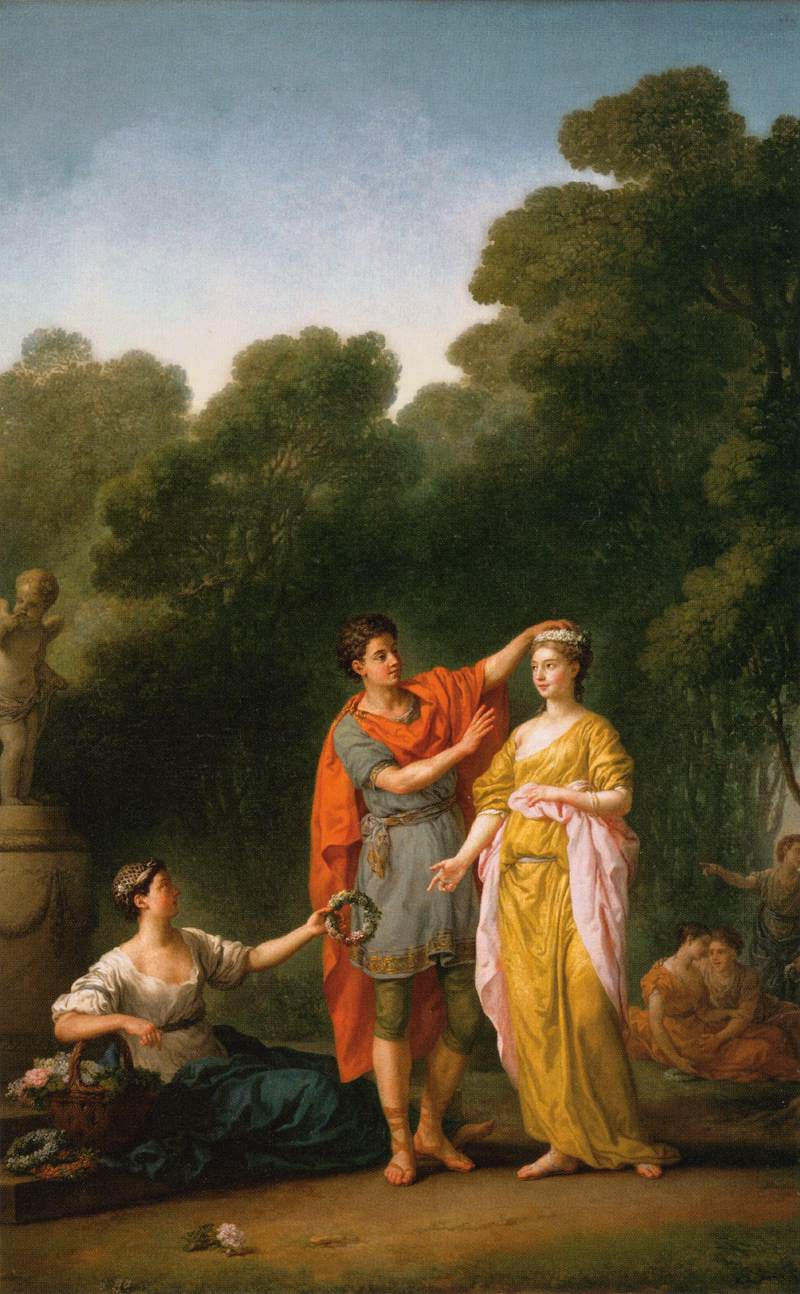
Lover Crowning His Mistress by Joseph-Marie Vien

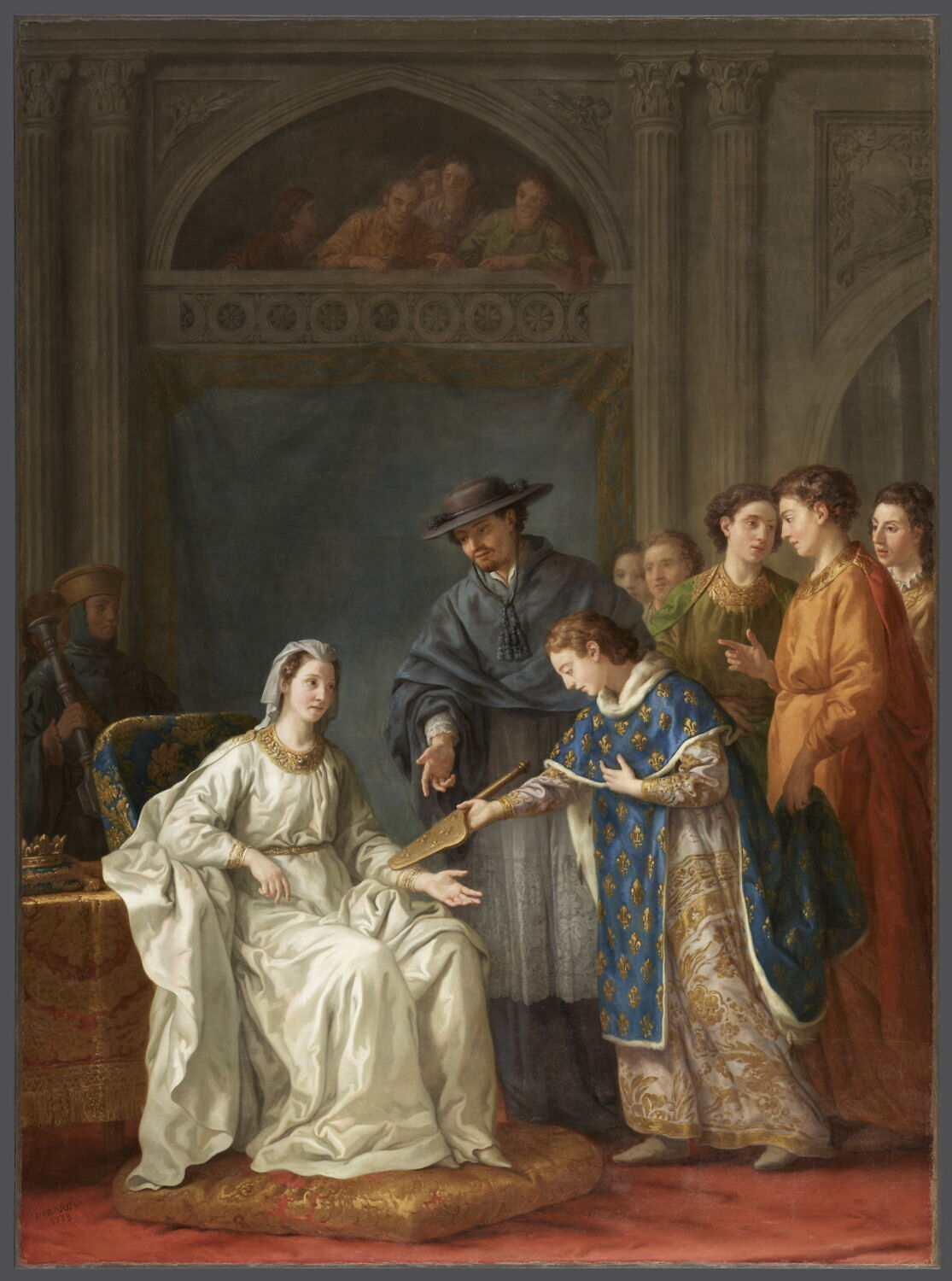
Saint Louis Handing Over the Regency to His Mother by Joseph-Marie Vien

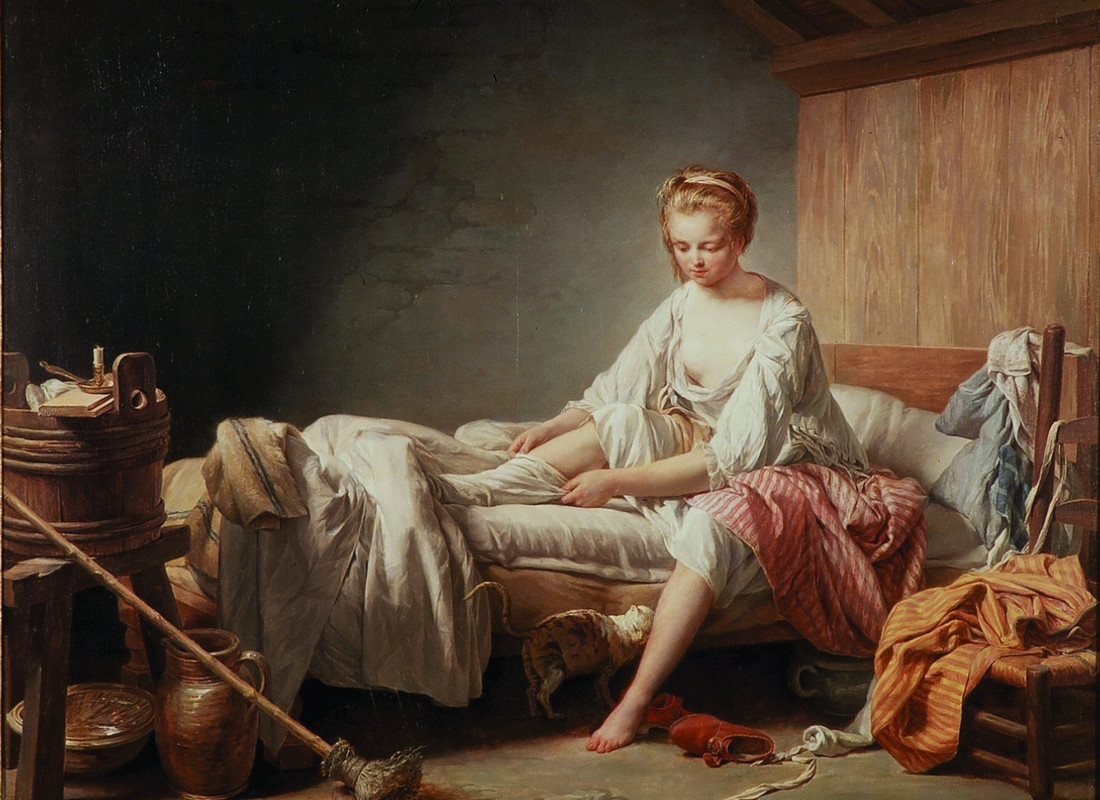
La Lever de Fanchon by Nicolas Bernard Lépicié

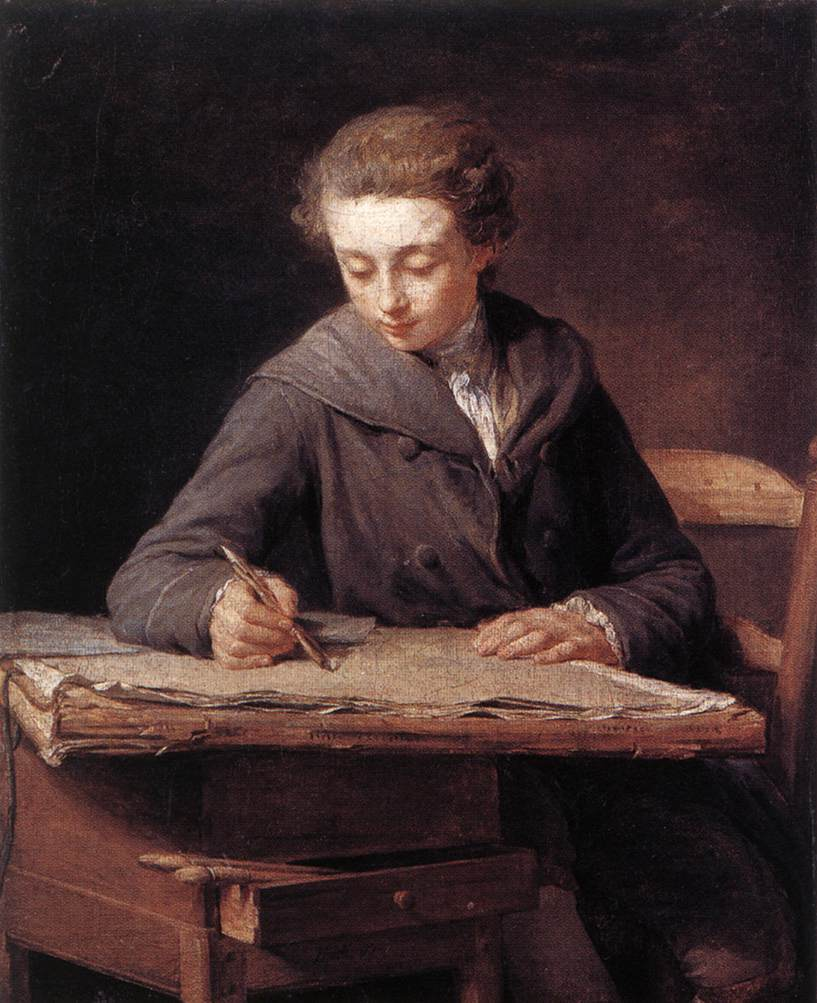
The Young Draughtsman by Nicolas Bernard Lépicié

A Sleeping Woman Awakened by the Sound of a Guitar by Jean-Baptiste Le Prince

== See also ==
- Royal Academy Exhibition of 1773, held in London
- Salon of 1775, the next Salon to be held in Paris

== Bibliography ==
- Baetjer, Katharine. French Paintings in The Metropolitan Museum of Art from the Early Eighteenth Century through the Revolution. Metropolitan Museum of Art, 2019.
- Levey, Michael. Painting and Sculpture in France, 1700-1789. Yale University Press, 1993.
- Poulet, Anne L. Jean-Antoine Houdon: Sculptor of the Enlightenment. University of Chicago Press, 2003.
