= Seaport by Moonlight =

Painting by Claude-Joseph Vernet

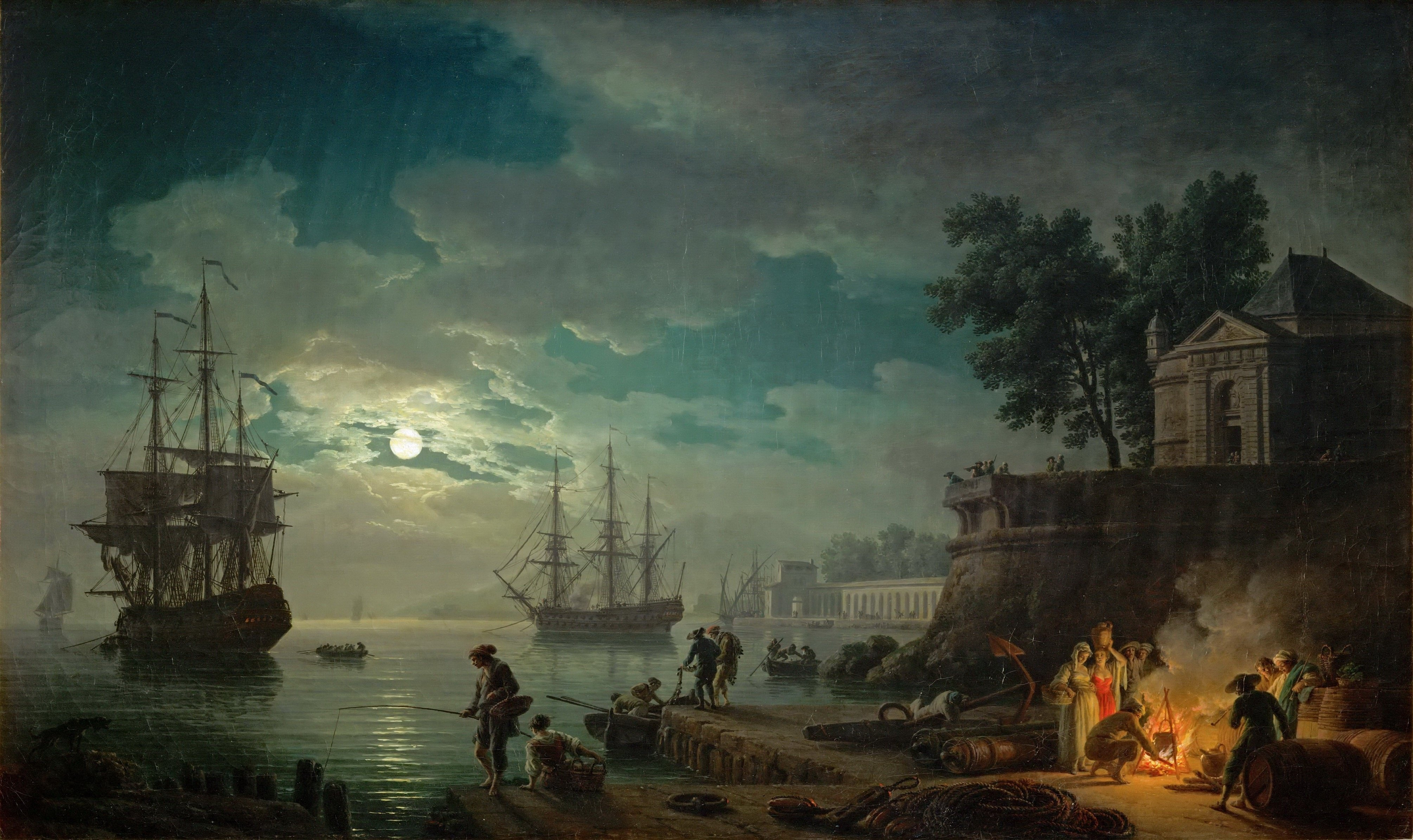
- Artist: Claude-Joseph Vernet
- Year: 1771
- Type: Oil on canvas, landscape painting
- Dimensions: 98 cm × 164 cm (39 in × 65 in)
- Location: Louvre; Paris

Seaport by Moonlight (French: Un port de mer au clair de lune) is an oil on canvas landscape painting by the French artist Claude-Joseph Vernet, from 1771. It features a moonlit view of a coast with a fictionalised seaport. A popular work, it was widely produced in engravings.

The painting was one of a series of four commissioned by Madame du Barry, the mistress of Louis XV for the Château de Madame du Barry. Each represented a time of the day, with this picture depicting night. It was displayed at the Salon of 1773 at the Louvre in Paris. Today it is in the collection of the Louvre, having been confiscated by the state during the French Revolution.

== Bibliography ==
- Pomarède, Vincent, Trébosc, Delphine. 1001 Paintings of the Louvre: From Antiquity to the Nineteenth Century. 5 Continents, 2006.
- Wolf, Norbert. Caspar David Friedrich: 1774-1840 : The Painter of Stillness. Taschen, 2003.
