= Sweet Melancholy =

Painting by Joseph-Marie Vien

- Artist: Joseph-Marie Vien
- Year: 1756
- Medium: Oil on canvas
- Dimensions: 68 cm (27 in) × 55 cm (22 in)
- Location: Cleveland Museum of Art, United States

Sweet Melancholy or Soft Melancholy (French: La Douce Mélancolie) is an oil on canvas painting by Joseph-Marie Vien, from 1756. It is held in the Cleveland Museum of Art. It was exhibited at the Salon of 1757 at the Louvre in Paris.

It is recorded in the cabinet of chevalier de Damery, a military officer and collector of prints, drawings and paintings, who after financial ruin had to sell his collection, ending his life in Les Invalides.

== Description ==
This painting centered on sentiment, which was part of the cabinet of the Chevalier de Damery, calls into question the predominance of historical painting, a noble genre par excellence. Although belonging to Antiquity, the young woman represents less a bygone historical era than a solitary character in the grip of the pain of love. This work constitutes a turning point in French painting of the 1750s, almost illustrating the qualities of "noble simplicity" and "quiet grandeur" in classical art recommended by Winckelmann, the previous year, in his Reflections on the imitation of Greek works in painting and sculpture.

The extroverted movements of the previous canvases have given way to the silent introspection of the academic tradition illustrated by Nicolas Poussin's Agrippina from The Death of Germanicus. This painting had an impact on Jacques-Louis David, then a pupil of Vien, which was felt in his later work. Nearly three decades later, in the 1780s, David revived his master's attempts to offer a new mode of pictorial and emotive representation in a simple style by putting female figures in antique togas arranging garlands of flowers on ancient busts, offering doves to Venus or burning incense, according to codes inspired by new archaeological scholarship, often inspired by recent excavations at Pompeii and Herculaneum, to substitute a vision of heroism and virile sacrifice.
