= Joseph-Marie Vien =

French painter (1716–1809)

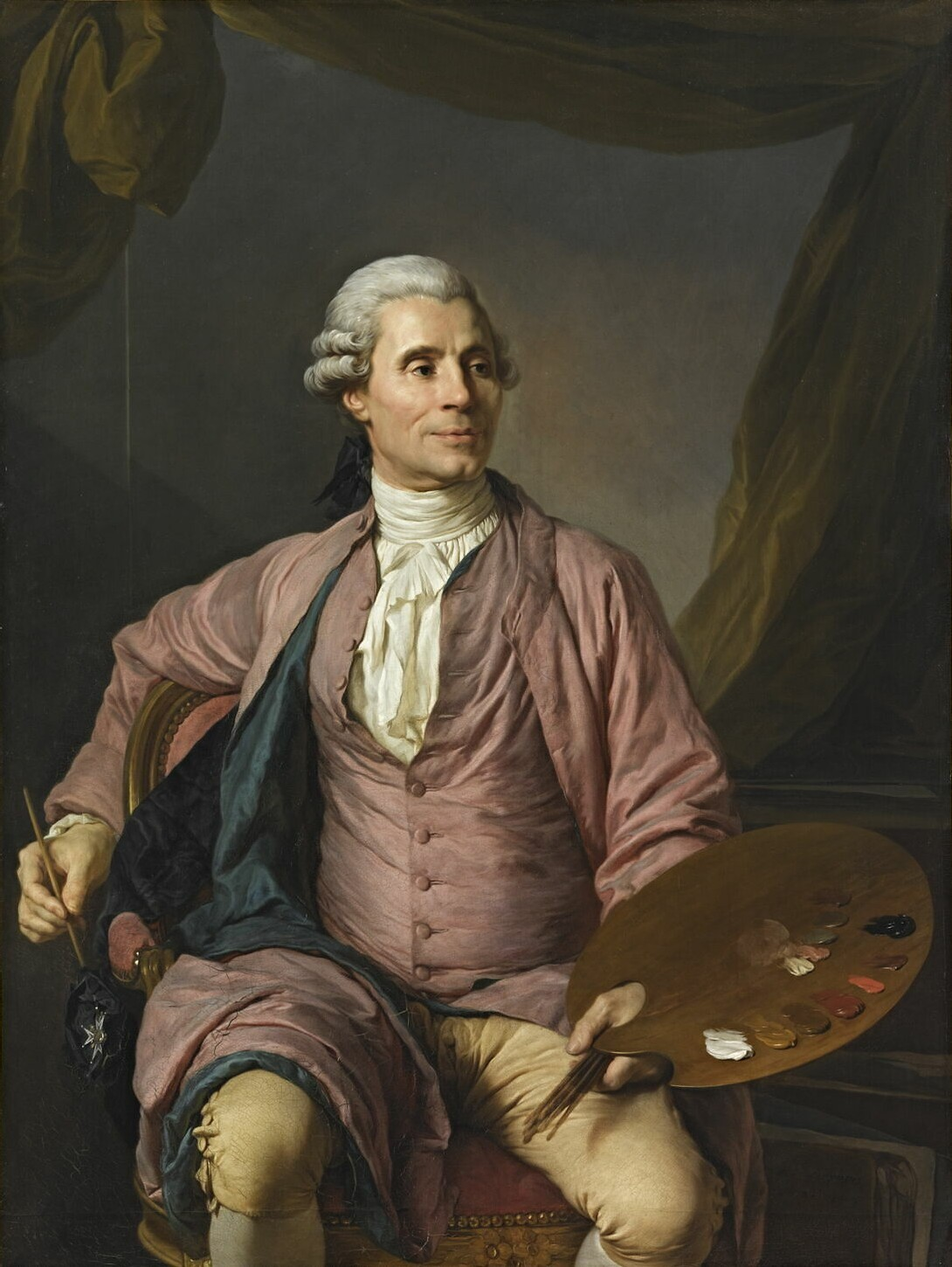
- Portrait of Joseph-Marie Vien by Joseph Duplessis, 1784
- Born: 18 June 1716; Montpellier, France
- Died: 27 March 1809 (aged 92); Paris, France
- Resting place: Panthéon, Paris
- Known for: Painting
- Spouse: Marie-Thérèse Reboul (m. 1757; died 1806)
- Children: Joseph-Marie Vien the young

Signature
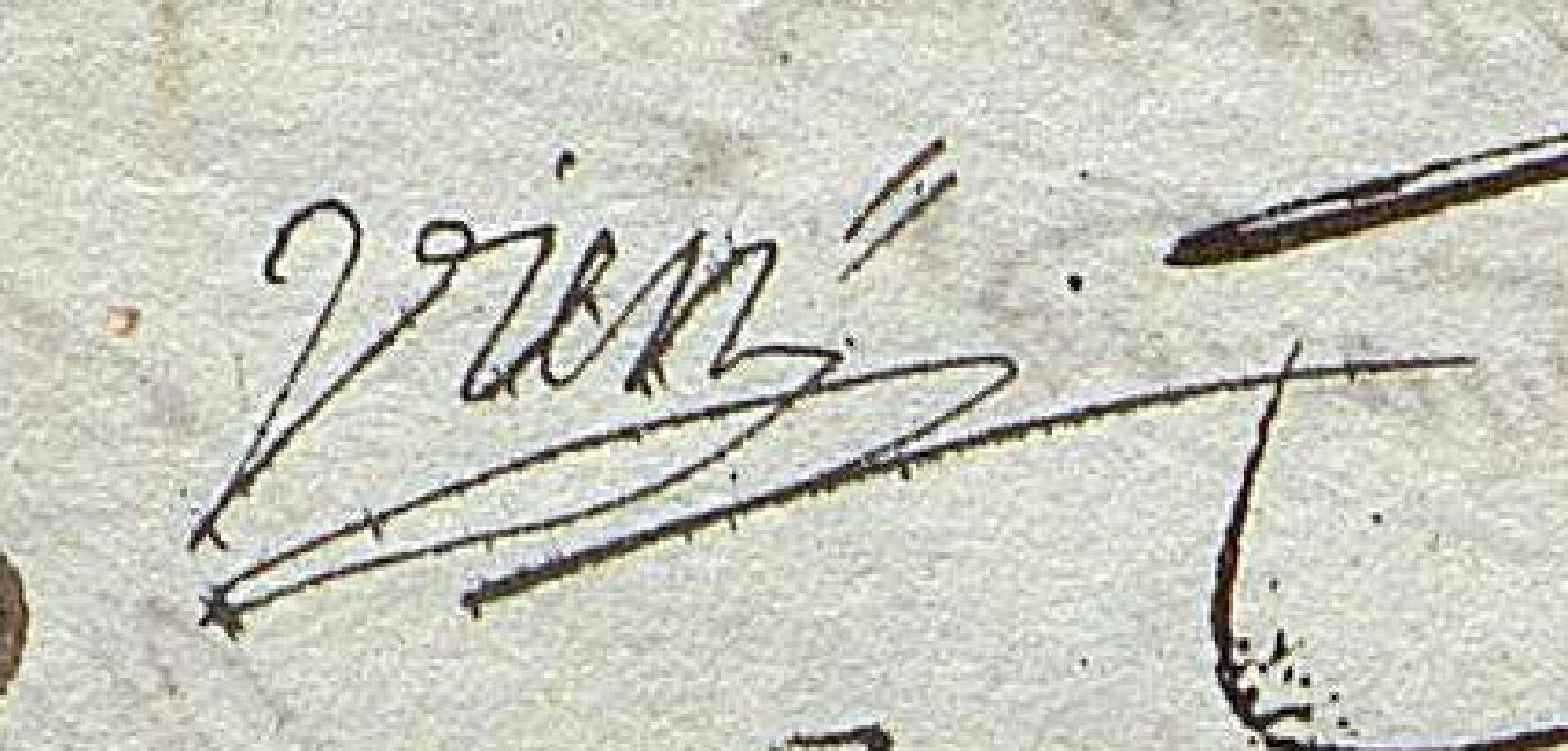

Joseph-Marie Vien (18 June 1716 – 27 March 1809) was a French painter. He was the last holder of the post of Premier peintre du Roi, serving from 1789 to 1791, before it was abolished during the French Revolution.

== Biography ==
He was born in Montpellier. As a protégé of the Comte de Caylus, he entered the studio of Natoire at an early age and obtained the Prix de Rome in 1745. He used his time at Rome in applying to the study of nature and the development of his own powers all that he gleaned from the masterpieces around him; but his tendencies were so foreign to the reigning taste that, upon his return to Paris, he owed his admission to the academy for his picture Daedalus and Icarus (Louvre) solely to the indignant protests of François Boucher.

In 1757, Joseph-Marie Vien married Marie-Thérèse Reboul, a French painter and engraver, who he also may have taught. Their son Joseph-Marie Vien the young was born in 1761 and later distinguished himself as a painter as well.

His most notably pupil was Jacques-Louis David, who had been referred to him by Jean-François Boucher in 1767 after refusing to take him on, stating he was too old to teach a young artist. Vien remained David’s primary mentor during his years of study at the French Royal Academy, through his three losses and achievement of the Prix de Rome in 1774. David’s first loss was directly due to the intervention of Vien, after his student had submitted without seeking his permission. In 1775, at the height of Vien’s established reputation, he was appointed director of the French Academy in Rome, David was among the pupils who traveled with him.

Joseph-Marie Vien died in Paris and was buried in the crypt of the Panthéon. He left behind many brilliant pupils, including François-André Vincent, Jean-Antoine-Théodore Giroust, Jean-Baptiste Regnault, Joseph-Benoît Suvée, Jean-Pierre Saint-Ours, François-Guillaume Ménageot, and Jean-Joseph Taillasson.

== Works ==
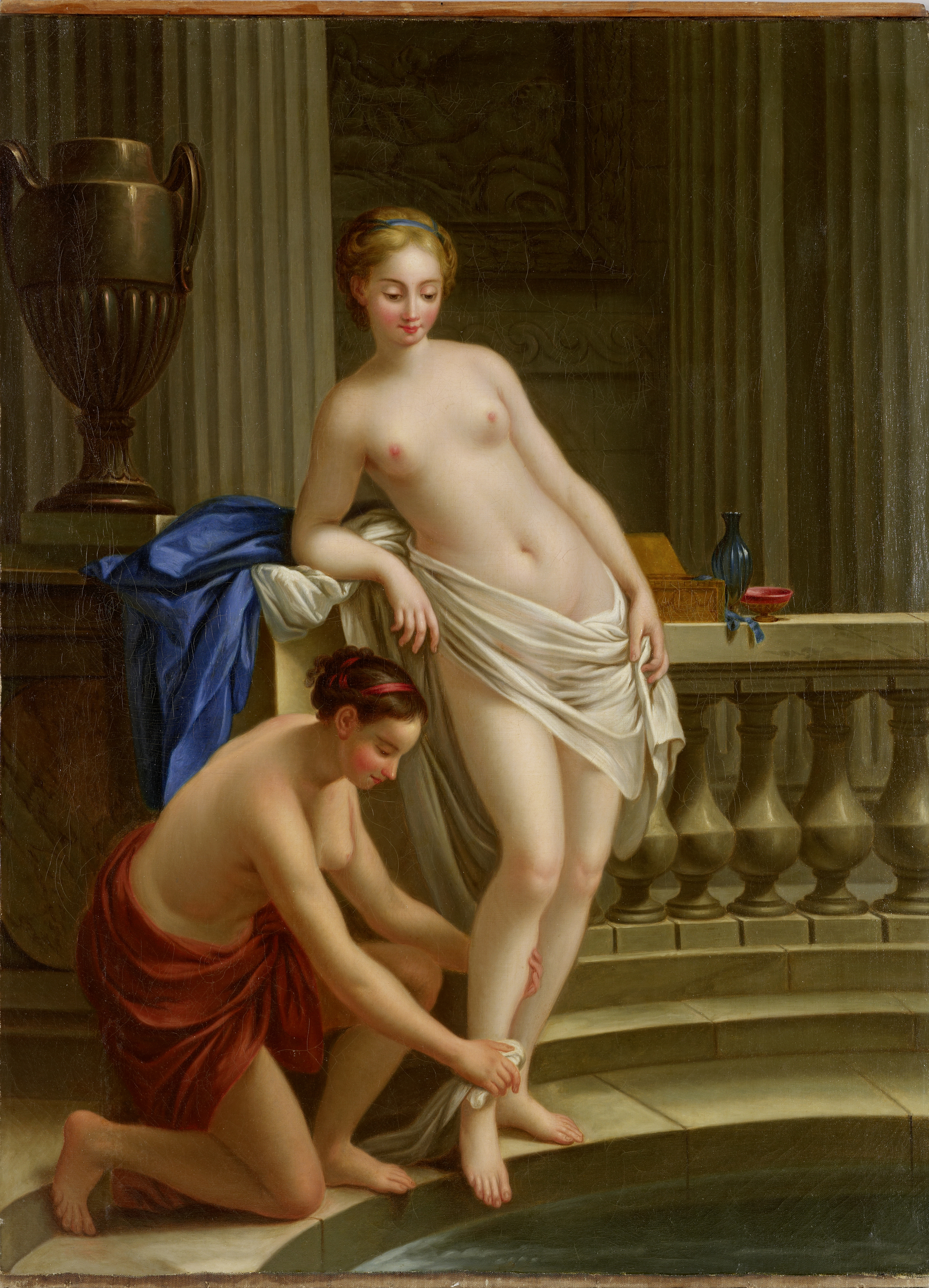
Two Women Bathing, Joseph-Marie Vien, 1763, Musée de Cahors Henri-Martin

- Sainte Marthe recevant le Christ à Bethanie (1747), Église Sainte-Marthe, Tarascon
- Saint Jérôme méditant sur un crâne, La Fère, Musée Jeanne d'Aboville
- La résurrection de Lazare (1747), Église Sainte-Marthe, Tarascon
- L'embarquement de sainte Marthe (1751), Église Sainte-Marthe, Tarascon
- L'arrivée de sainte Marthe en Provence (1748), Église Sainte-Marthe, Tarascon
- La prédication de sainte Marthe (1748), Église Sainte-Marthe, Tarascon
- L'agonie de sainte Marthe (1748), Église Sainte-Marthe, Tarascon
- Les funérailles de sainte Marthe (1748), Église Sainte-Marthe, Tarascon
- Hermite endormi (1753), Musée du Louvre
- Dédale dans le Labyrinthe attachant les ailes à Icare (1754), Musée du Louvre
- St Theresa of Avila (1754–55), New Orleans Museum of Art
- La Douce Mélancolie (1756), Cleveland Museum of Art
- L'Enlèvement de Proserpine (1762), Museum of Grenoble
- La Marchande d'amours (1763), Palace of Fontainebleau
- Une Femme qui sort des bains, 1763, (huile 95x68 cm) (private collection)
- Saint Denis préchant (1767), Church of Saint-Roch, Paris
- Grecque au bain (1767), Museo de Arte de Ponce, Puerto Rico
- Jeunes grecques parant de fleurs l'Amour endormi (1773), Musée du Louvre
- Saint Louis Handing Over the Regency to His Mother (1773), Saint-Louis Chapel, École Militaire, Paris
- Venus, Wounded by Diomedes, Is Saved by Iris (1775), Columbus Museum of Art
- Les adieux d'Hector et d'Andromaque (1786), Musée du Louvre
- Love Fleeing Slavery (1789), Princeton University Art Museum
- Toilette d'une jeune mariée dans le costume antique, (100x135 cm) (private collection)

== Gallery ==
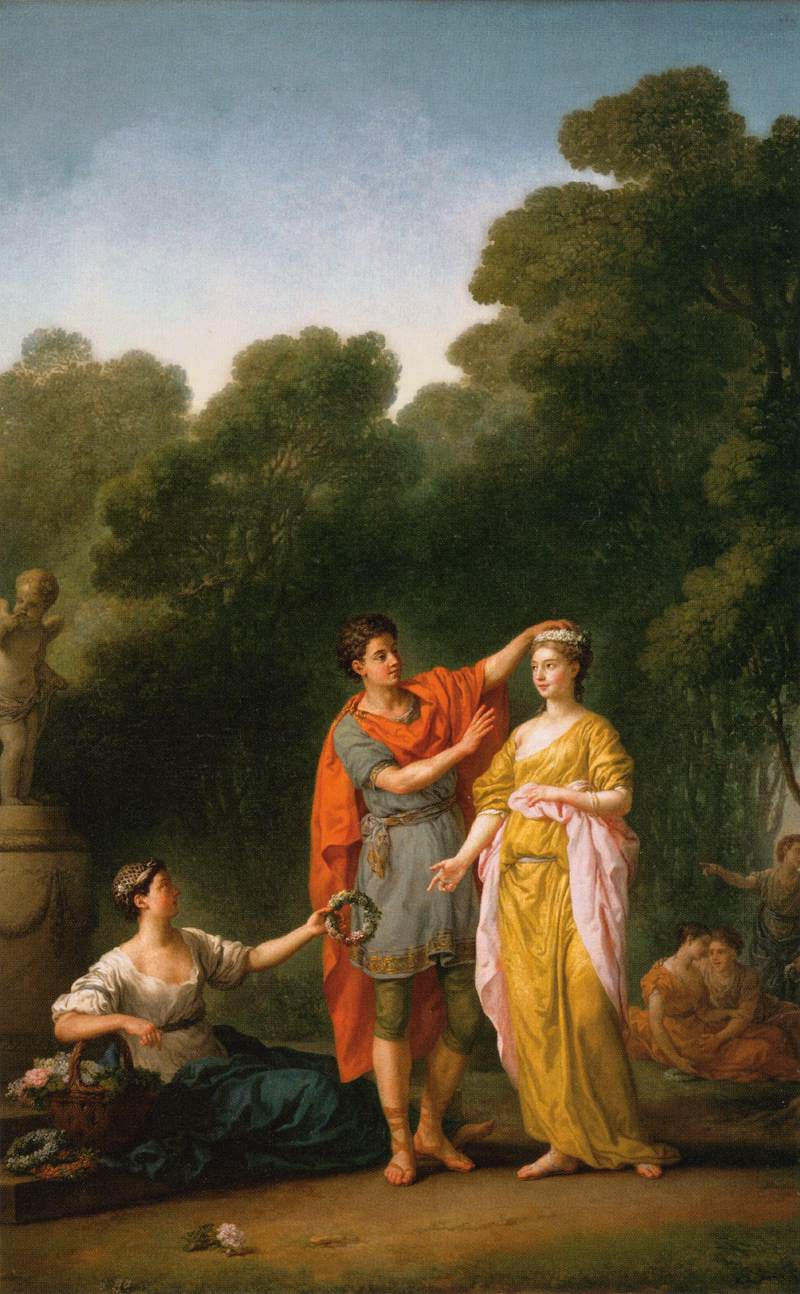
Lover Crowning his Mistress

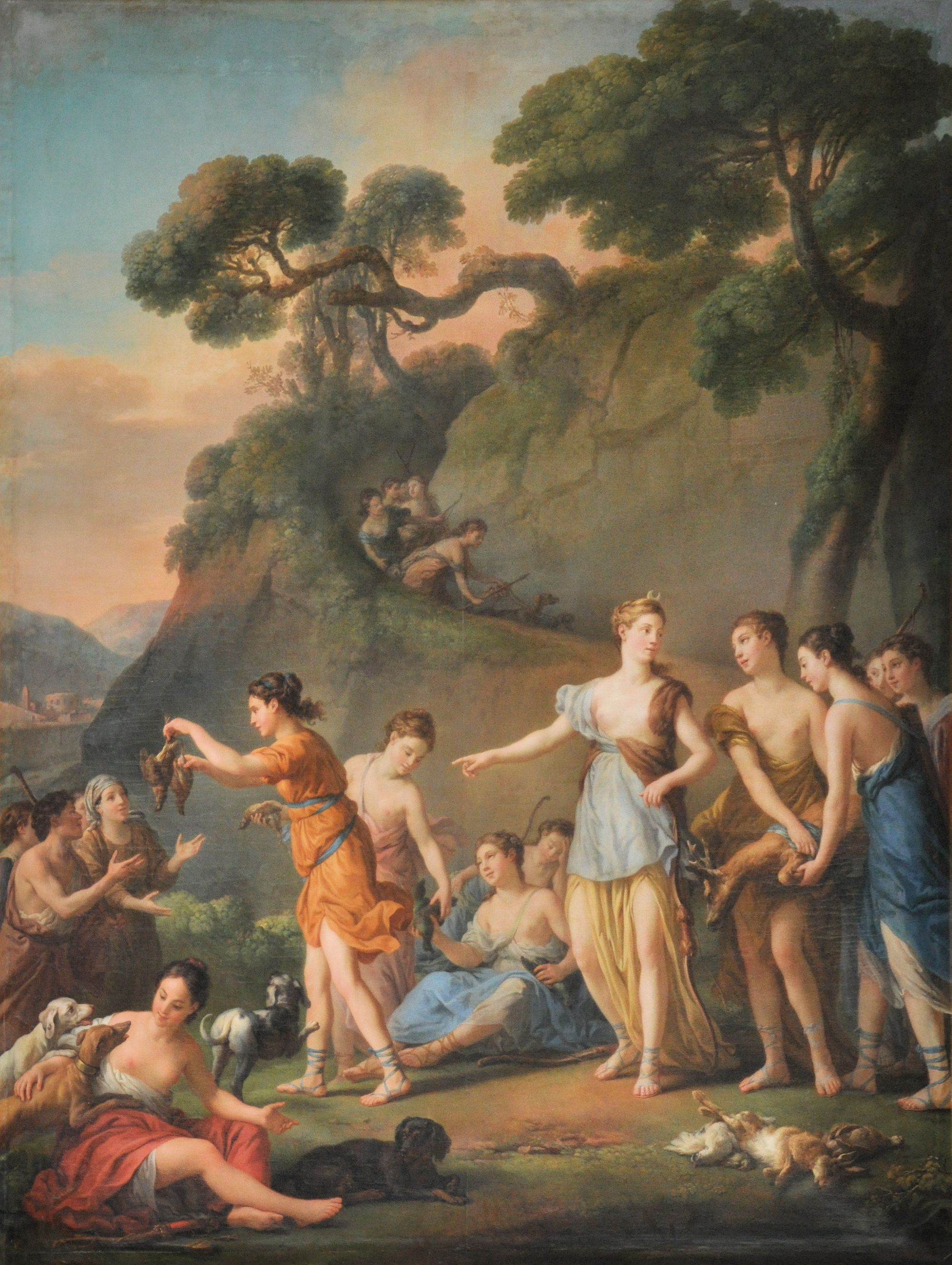
The Chase

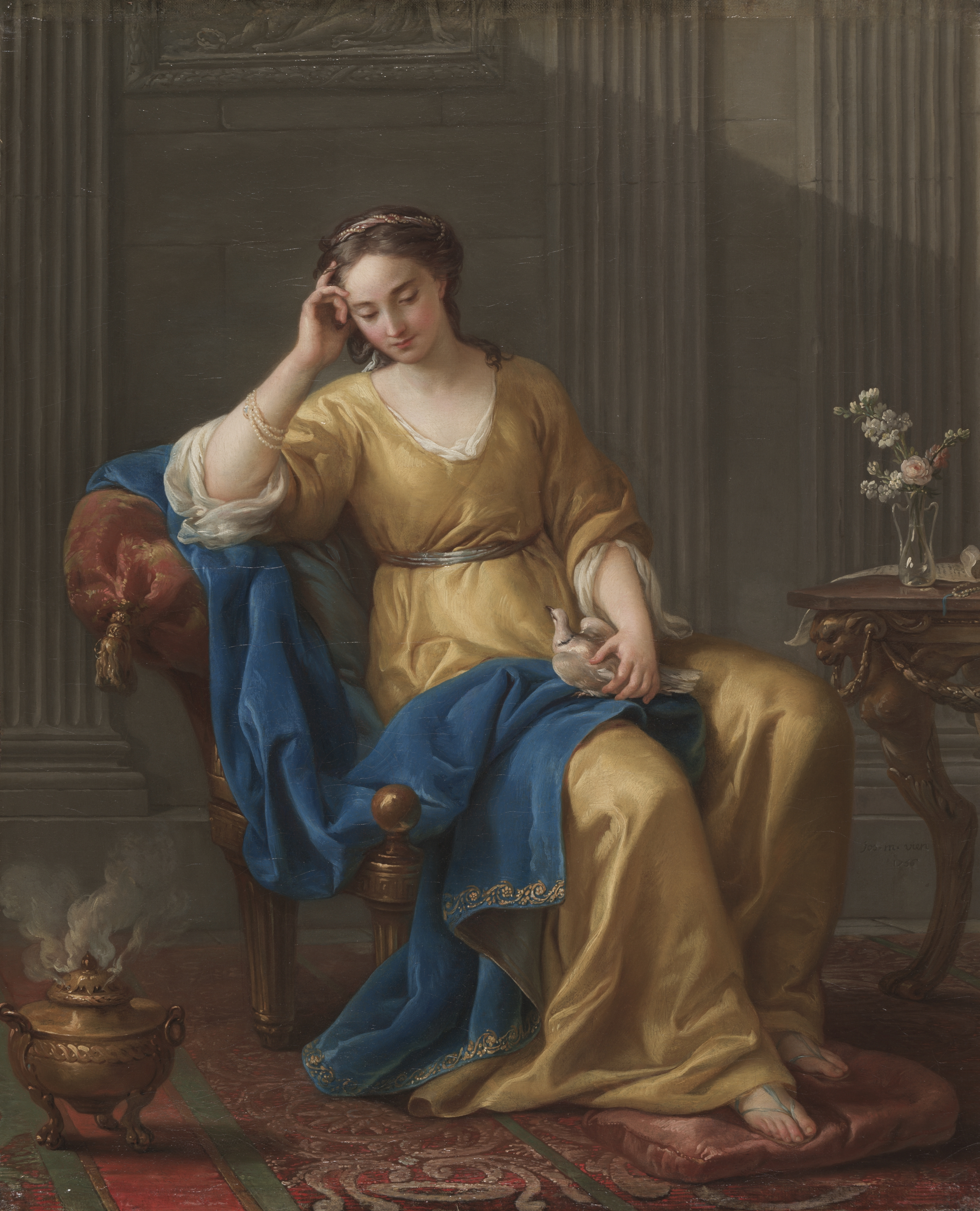
Sweet Melancholy, 1756

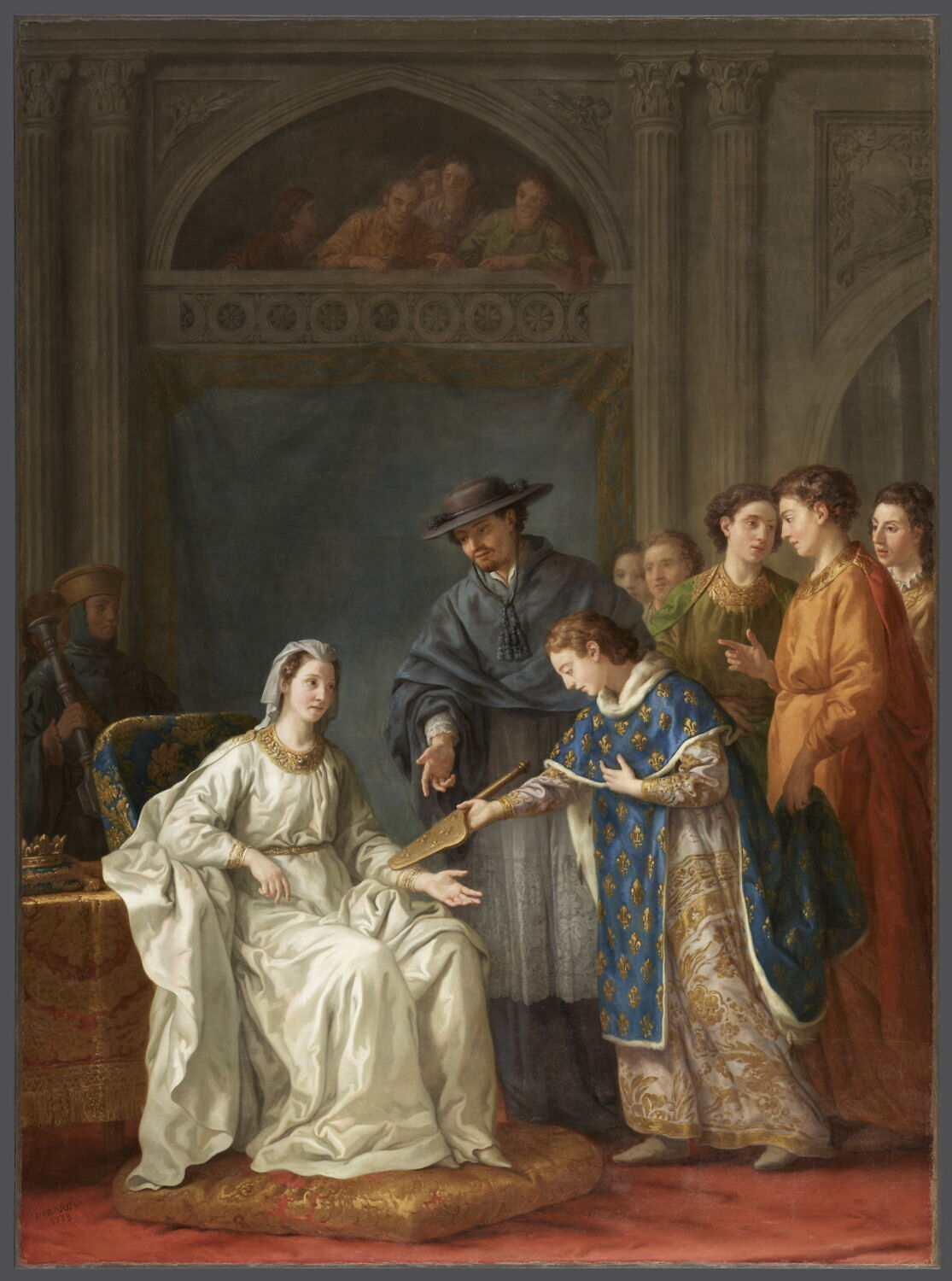
Saint Louis Handing Over the Regency to His Mother, 1773

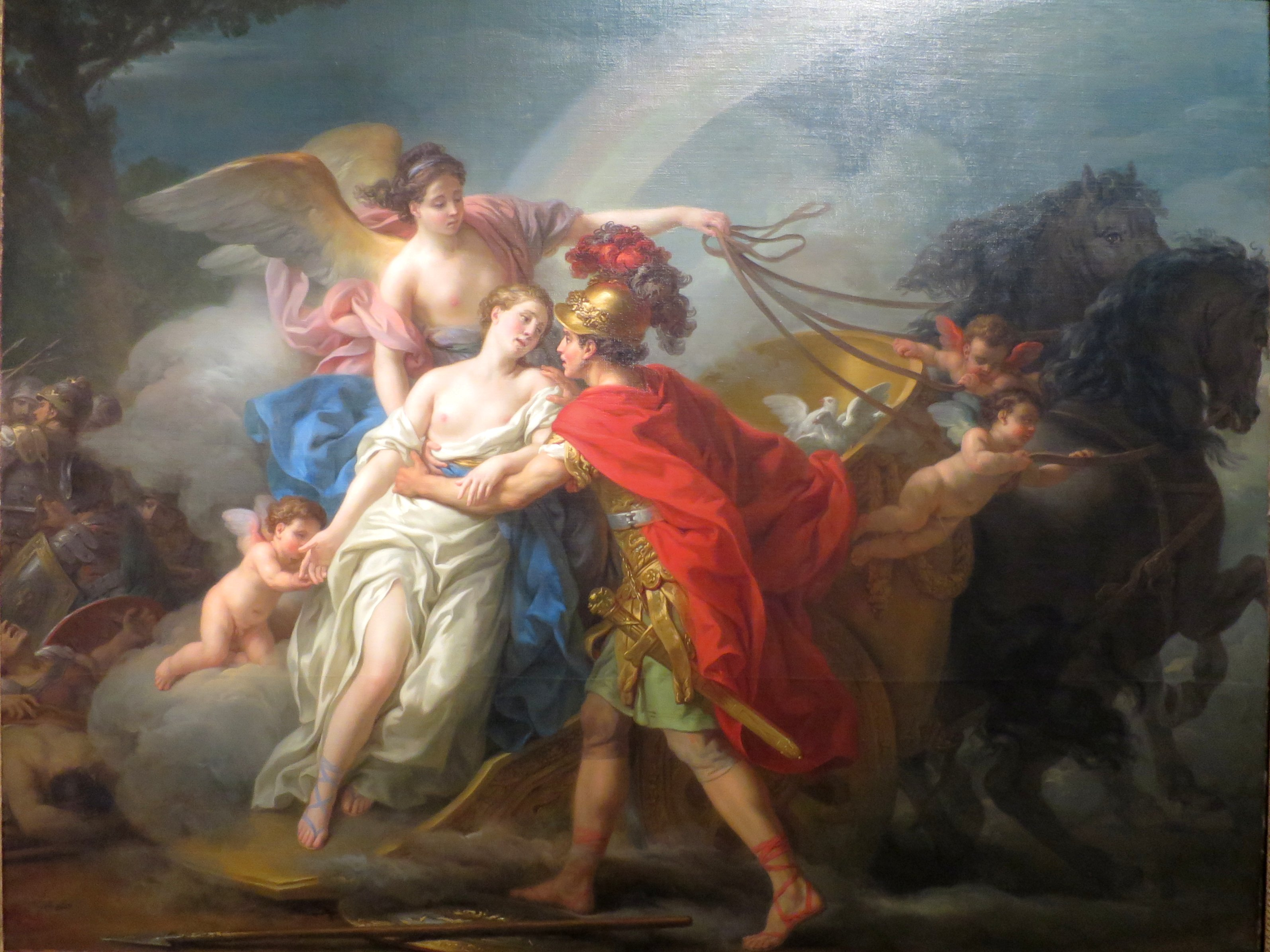
Venus, Wounded by Diomedes, Is Saved by Iris, 1775

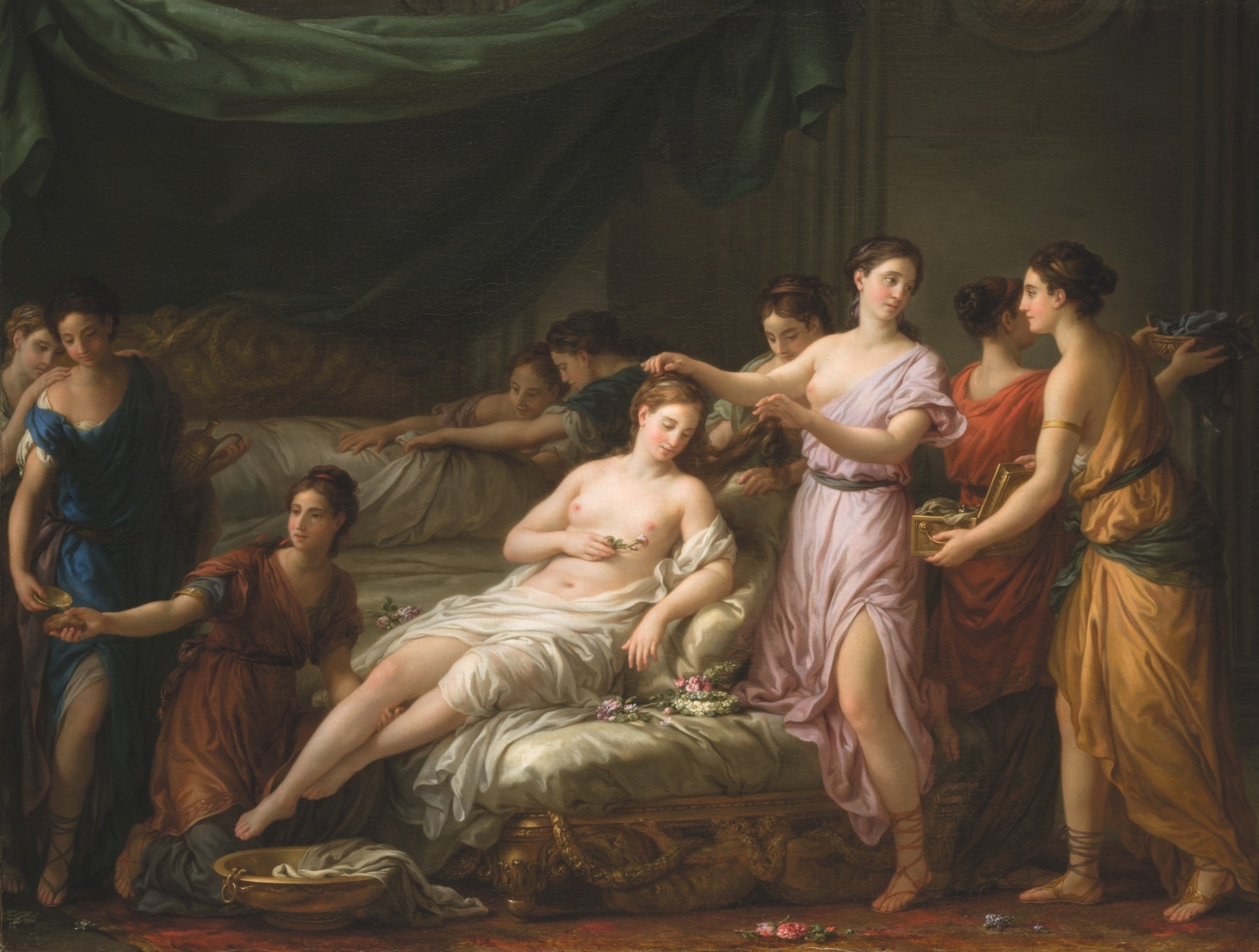
Women in Classical Dress Attending a Young Bride, 1777

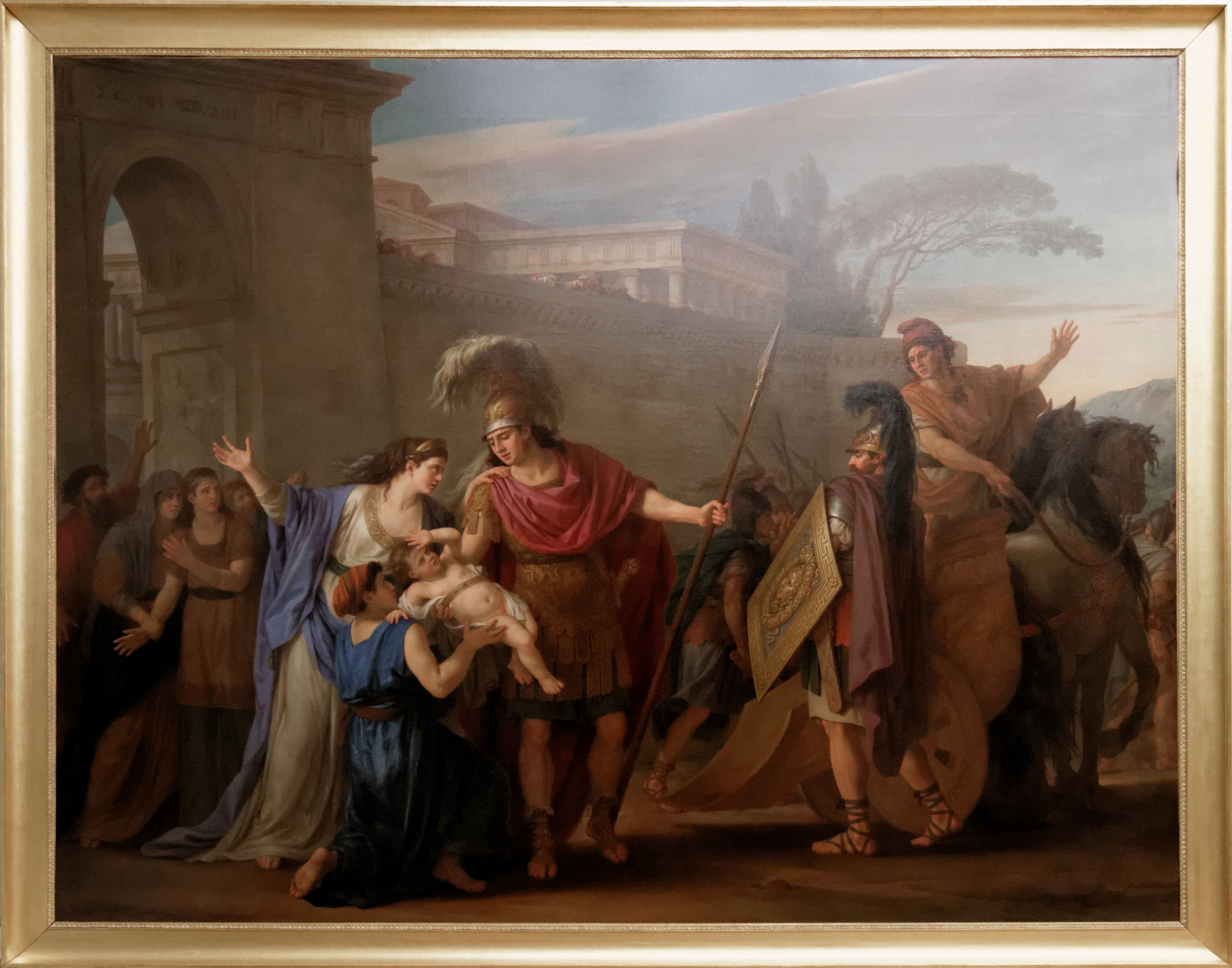
The Farewell of Hector and Andromache, 1786

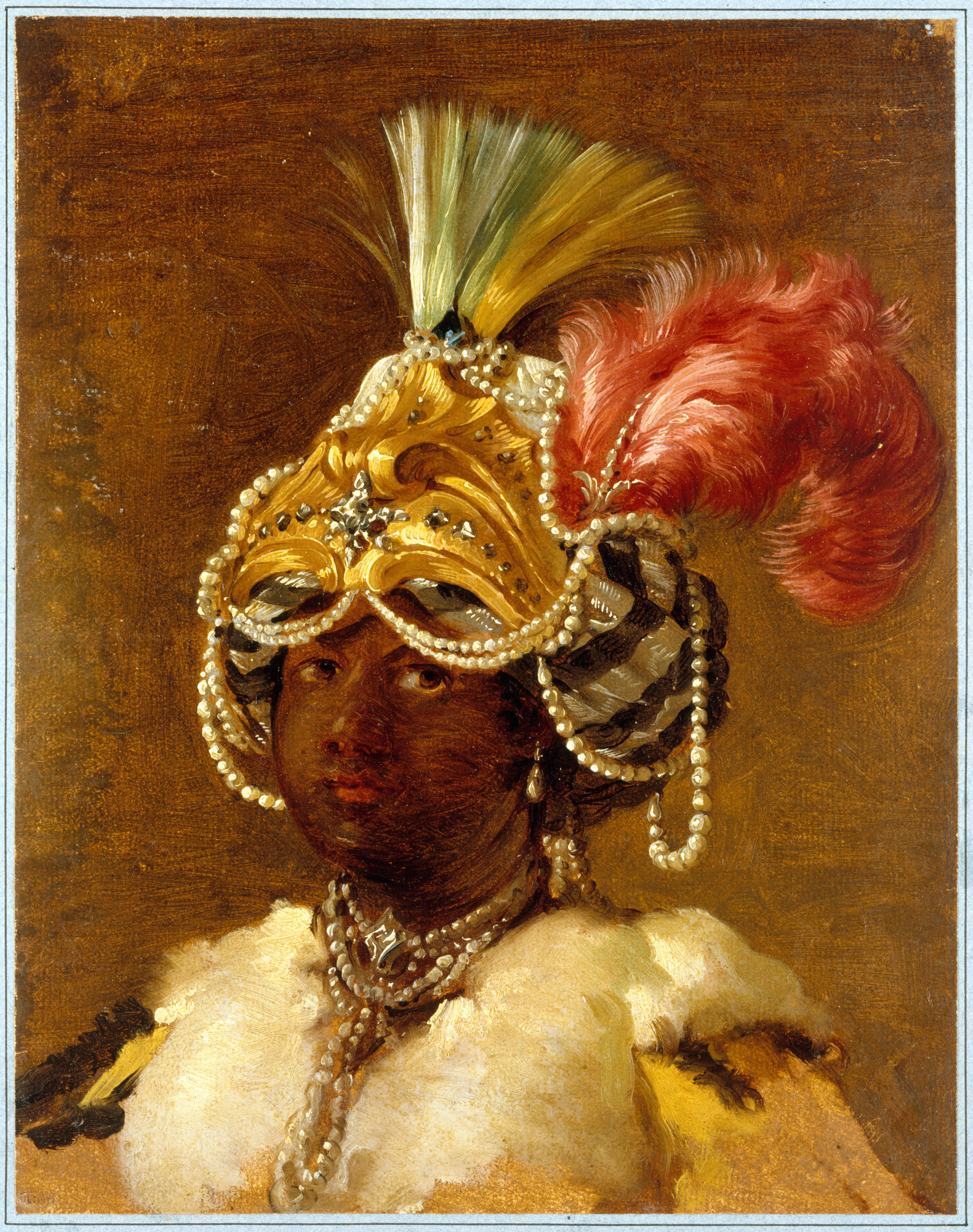
Black Sultana

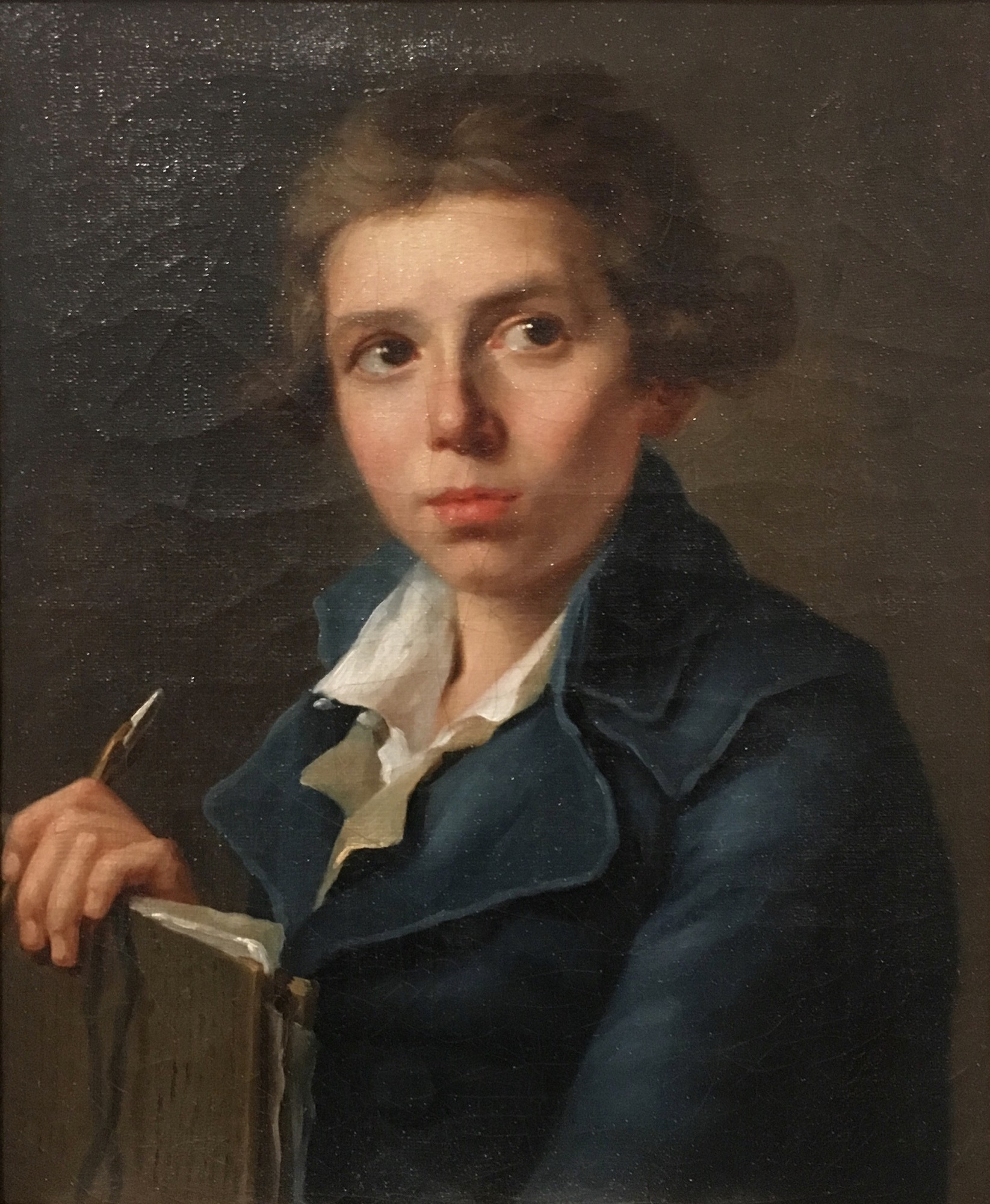
Jacques Louis David as a Teenager

== Sources ==
- "Joseph-Marie Vien". Encyclopaedia Britannica.
- "Vien, Joseph-Marie". J. Paul Getty Museum.
- "Jacques-Louis David". University of North Carolina Press.
