= Salon of 1775 =

1775 art exhibition in Paris

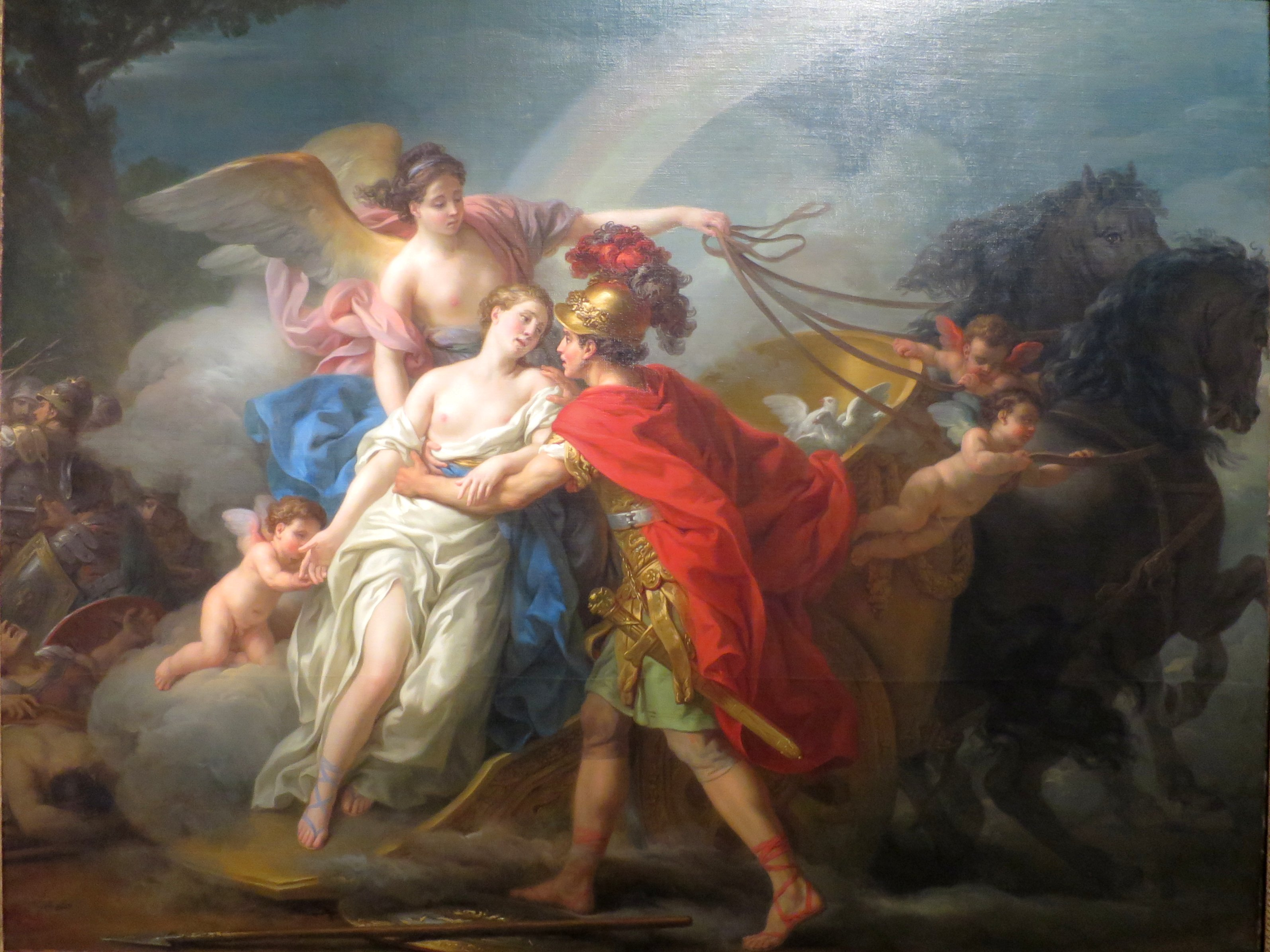
Venus, Wounded by Diomedes, Is Saved by Iris by Joseph-Marie Vien

The Salon of 1775 was an art exhibition held at the Louvre in Paris. Part of the regular series of Salons organised by the Académie Royale, it ran from 25 August to 25 September 1775. It was the first to be held following the death of Louis XV who had reigned in France for sixty years. In May he had been succeeded by his grandson Louis XVI who would later be overthrown and executed during the French Revolution.

Reflecting the emerging Neoclassicism Joseph-Marie Vien displayed his history painting Venus, Wounded by Diomedes, Is Saved by Iris. The sculptor Jean-Antoine Houdon established a number of works that helped establish his reputation as one of the foremost portrait sculptures in Europe. These included busts of the composer Christoph Willibald Gluck, the soprano Sophie Arnould and the ministers Jacques Turgot and the Marquis de Miromesnil. Louis Jean-Jacques Durameau's history scene The Return of Belisarius featured Belisarius, a popular subject in art during the era. Étienne Aubry displayed his genre paintings Paternal Love and The Shepherdess of the Alps.

Charles-Amédée-Philippe van Loo exhibited The Coronation of Saint Louis, depicting a scene from medieval French history. François-Hubert Drouais appearing at the Salon for the final time submitted a portrait of Clotilde of France, a younger sister of the new monarch, playing the guitar. The landscape painter Joseph Vernet produced two companion pieces The Approach to a Fair and Constructing a Main Road as part of a commission from the Controller-General of Finances Joseph Marie Terray. Amongst the works displayed by Hubert Robert is the now lost large Le décintrement du pont de Neuilly, a sketch for which is in the Musée Carnavalet.

== Gallery ==
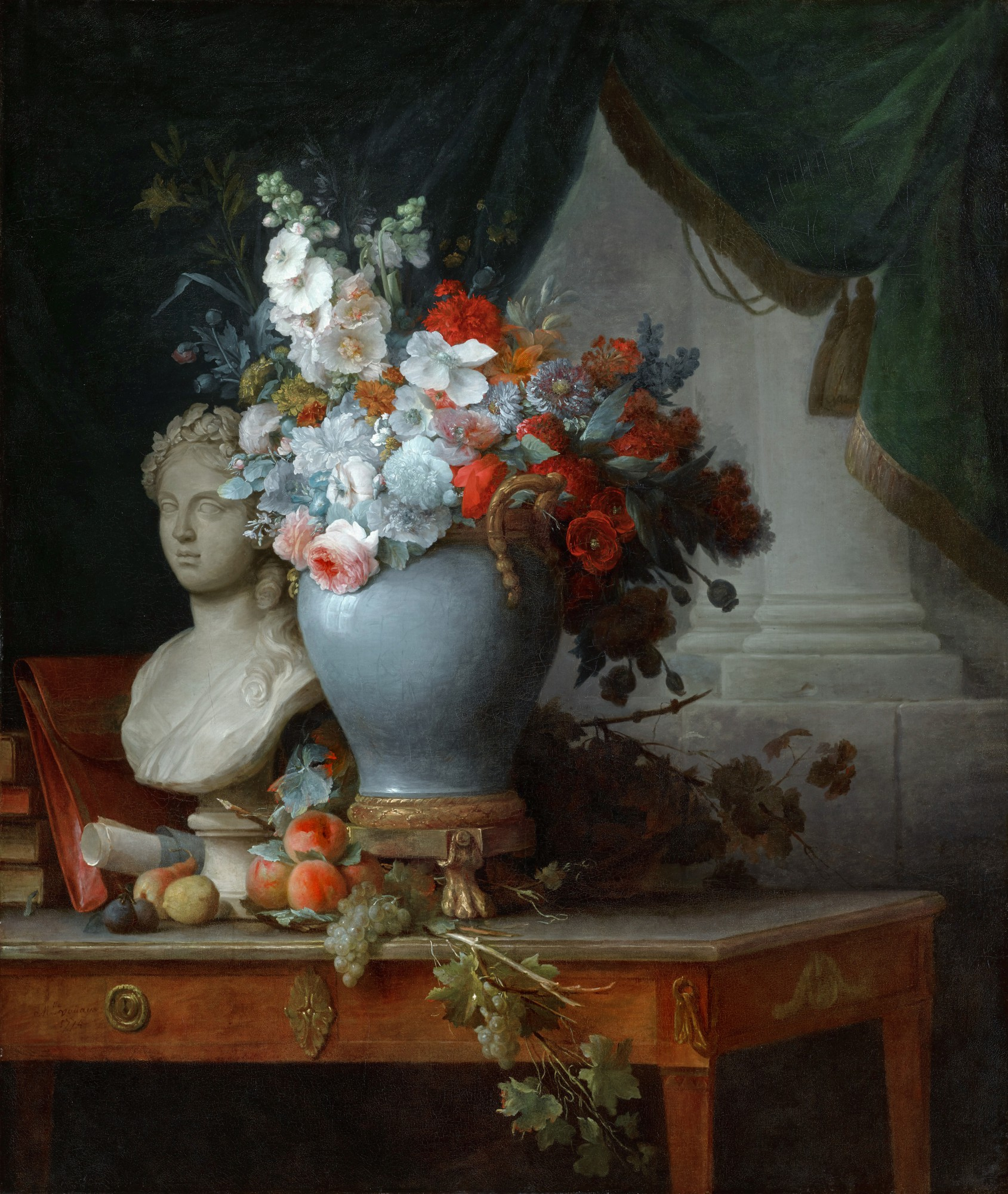
Vase of Flowers with a Bust of Flora by Anne Vallayer-Coster

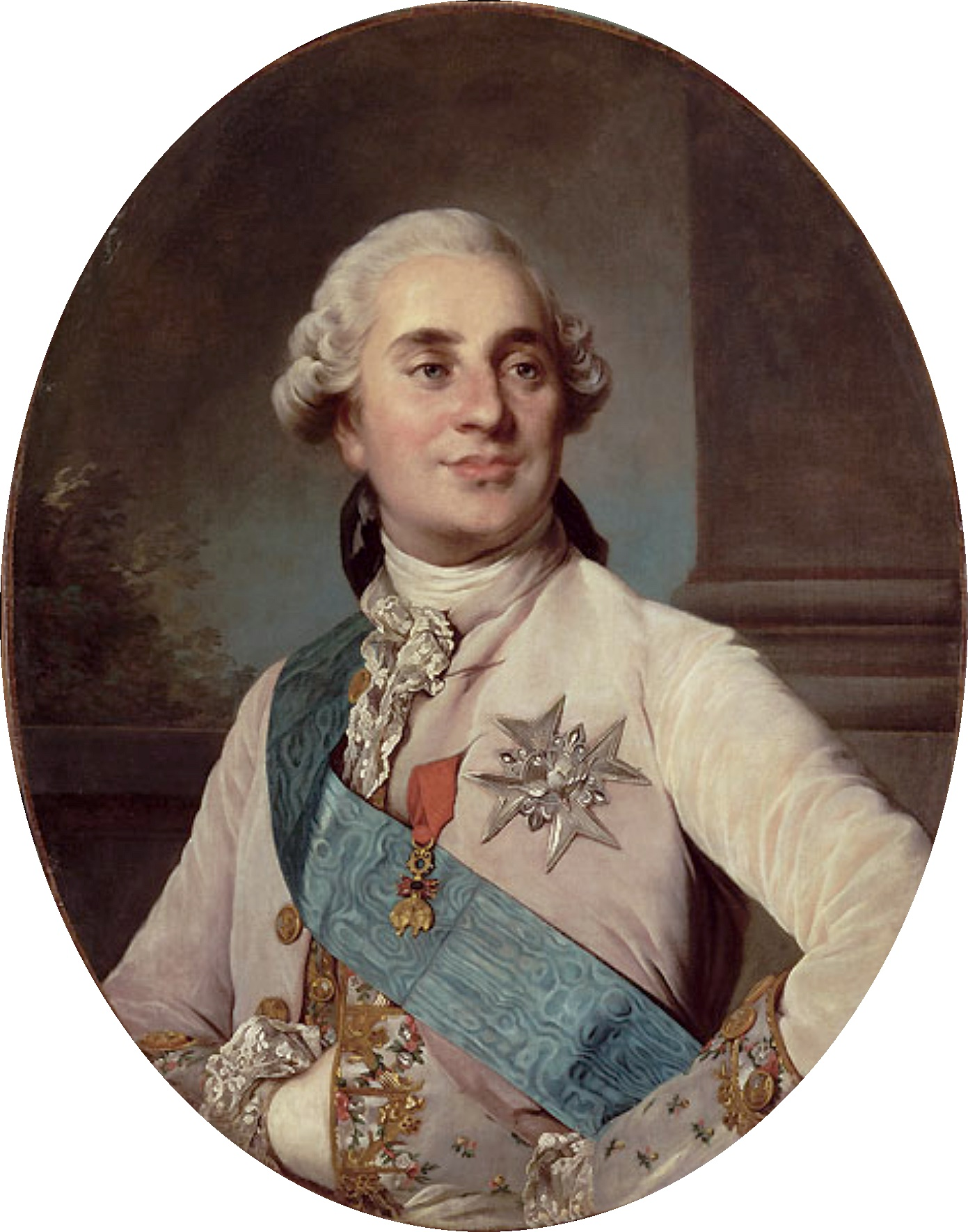
Portrait of Louis XVI by Joseph Duplessis

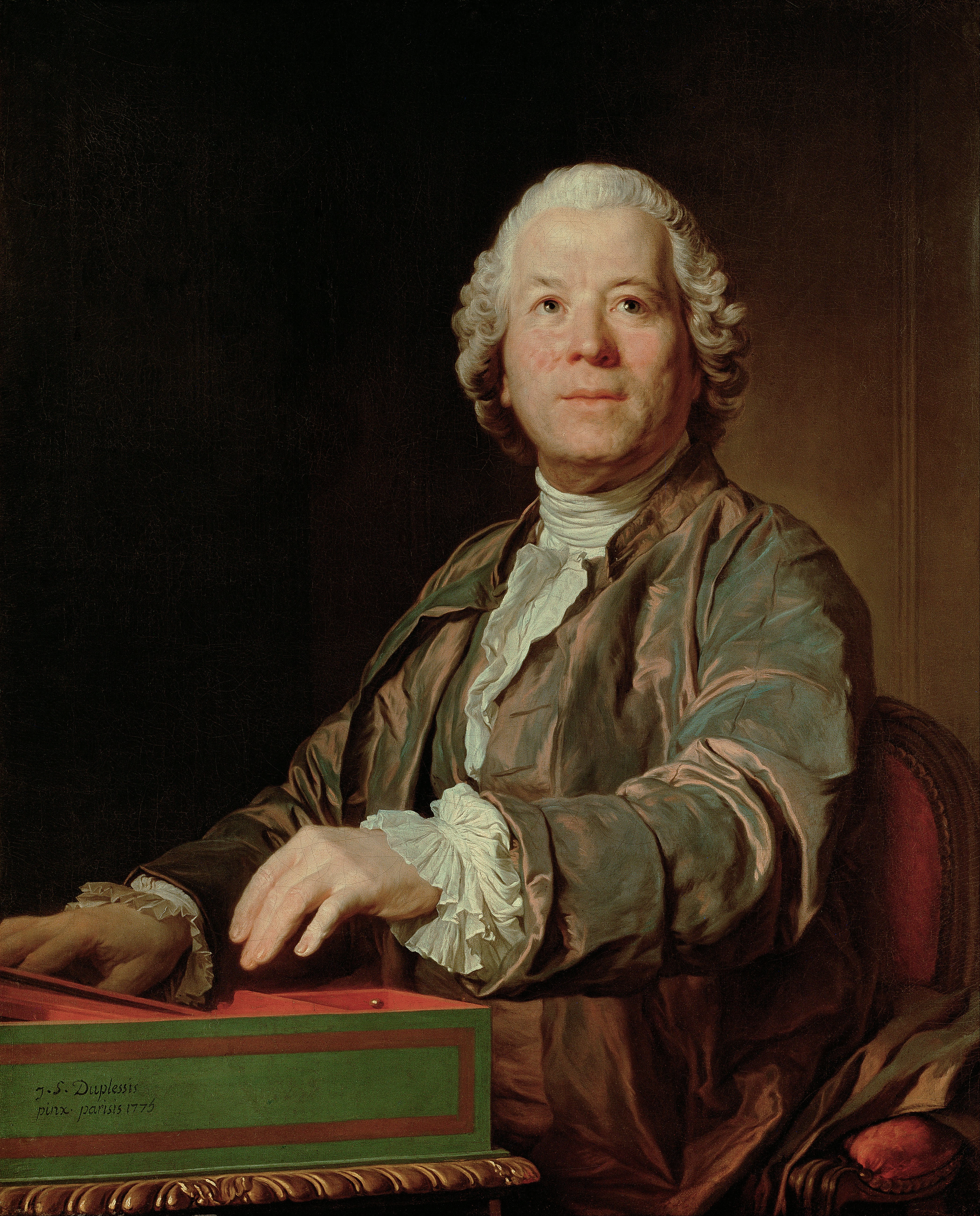
Portrait of Christoph Willibald Gluck by Joseph Duplessis

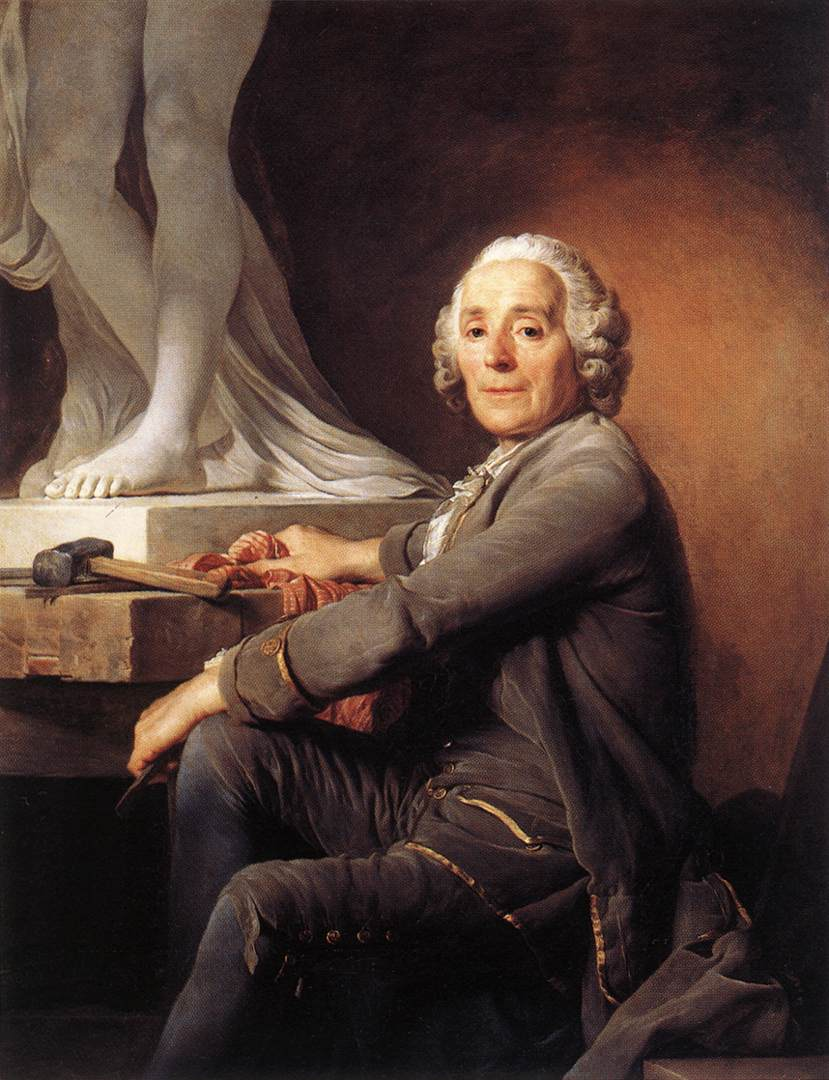
Portrait of Christophe Gabriel Allegrain by Joseph Duplessis

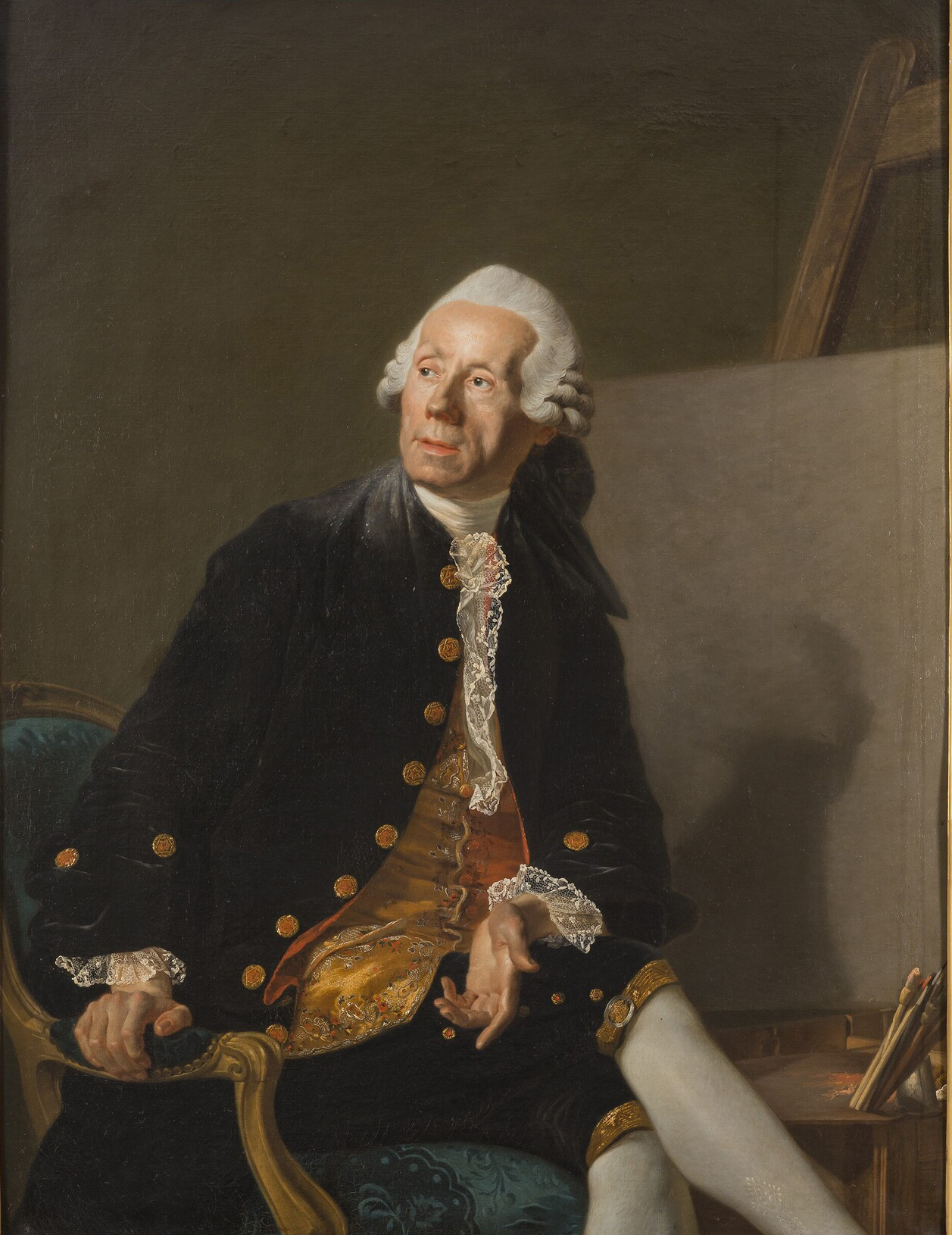
Portrait of Noël Hallé by Étienne Aubry

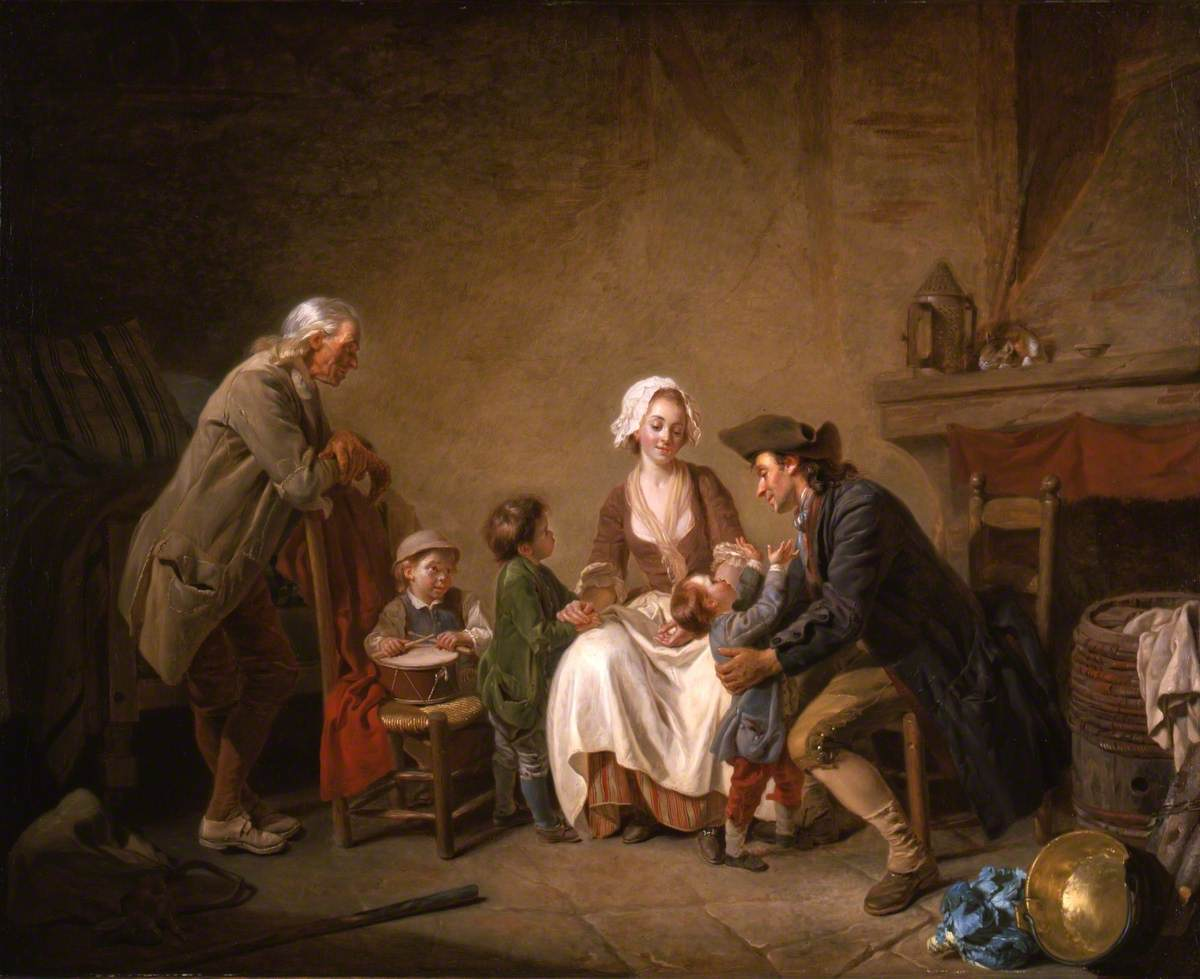
Paternal Love by Étienne Aubry

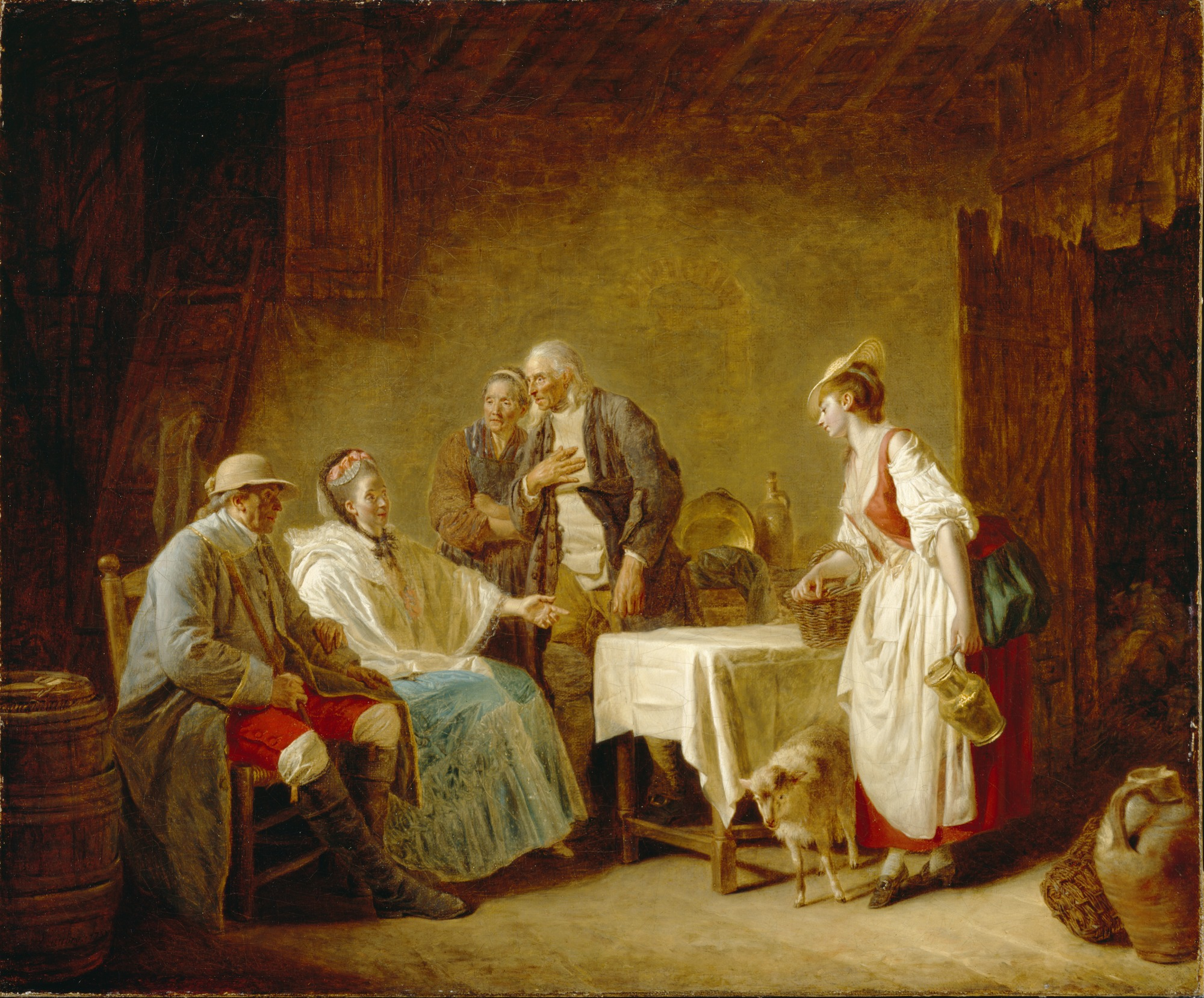
The Shepherdess of the Alps by Étienne Aubry

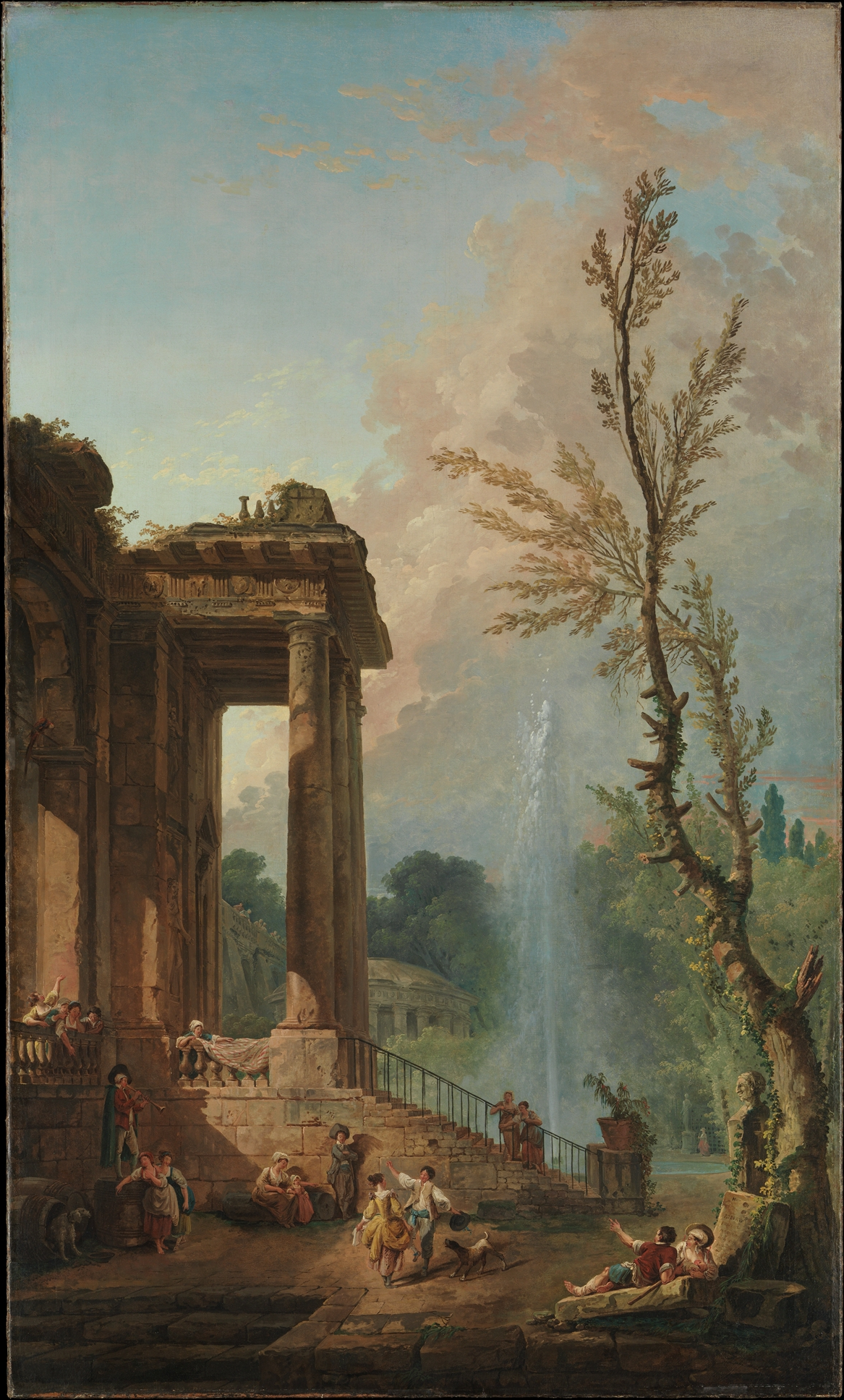
The Portico of a Country Mansion by Hubert Robert

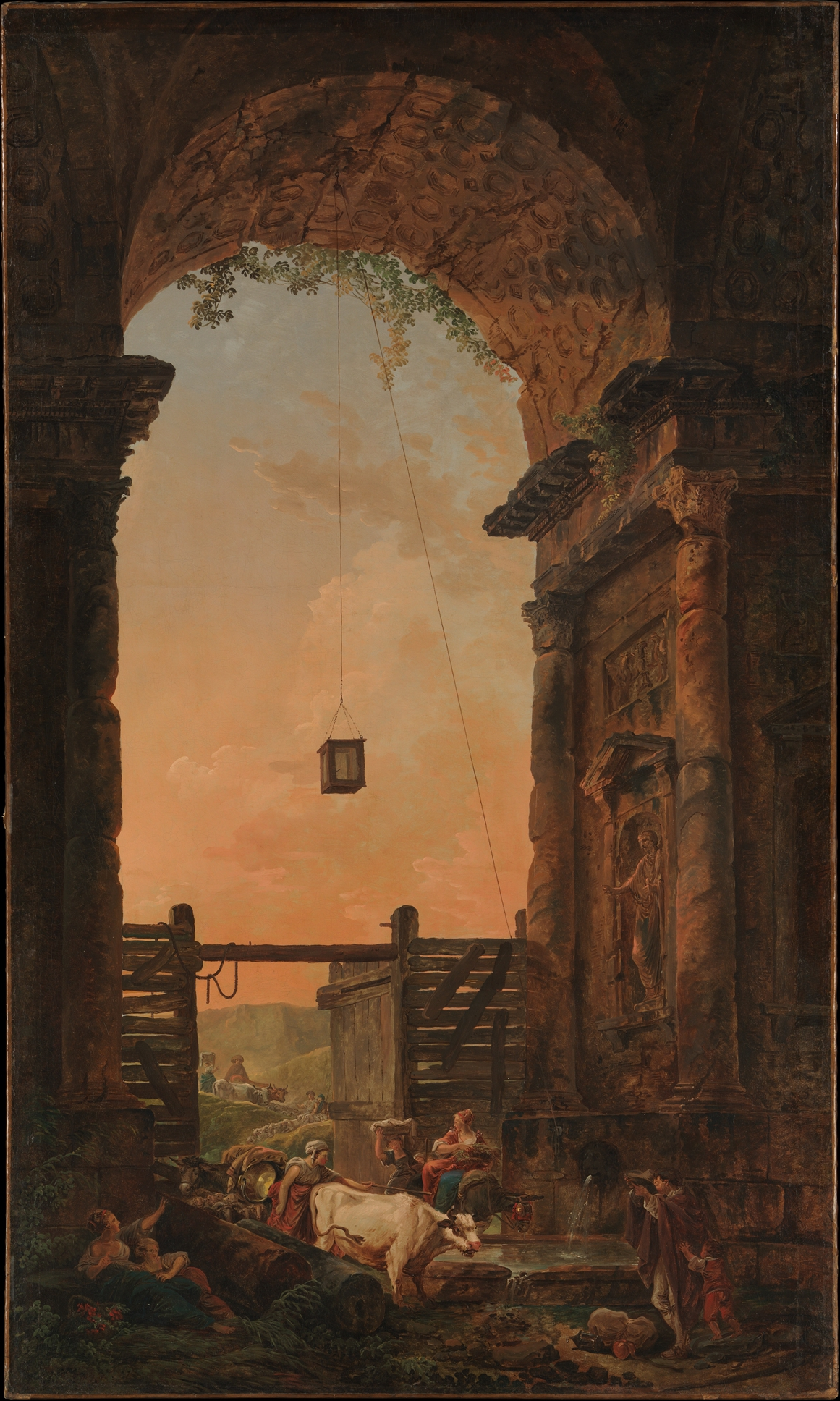
The Return of the Cattle by Hubert Robert

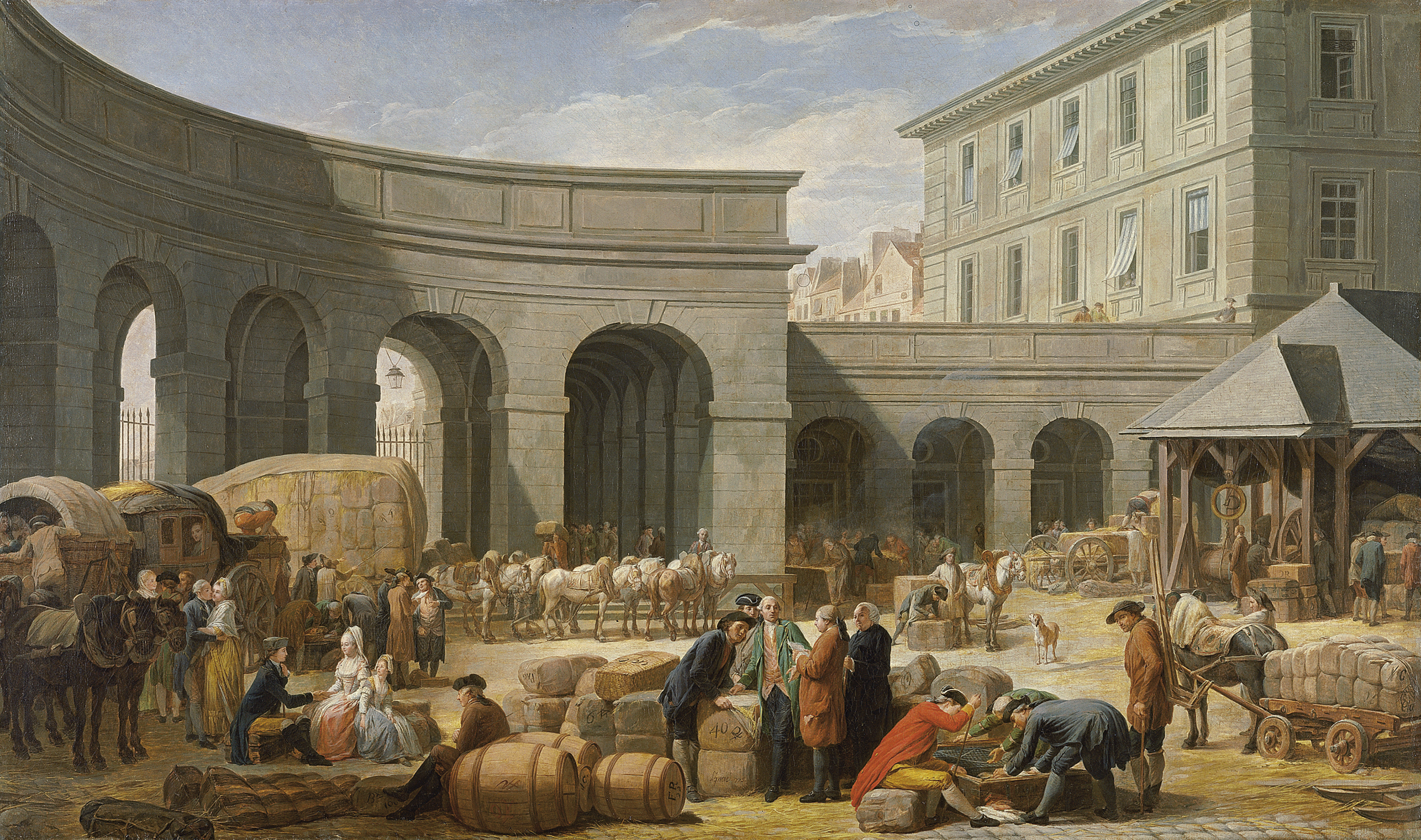
The Interior of a Customs House by Nicolas Bernard Lépicié

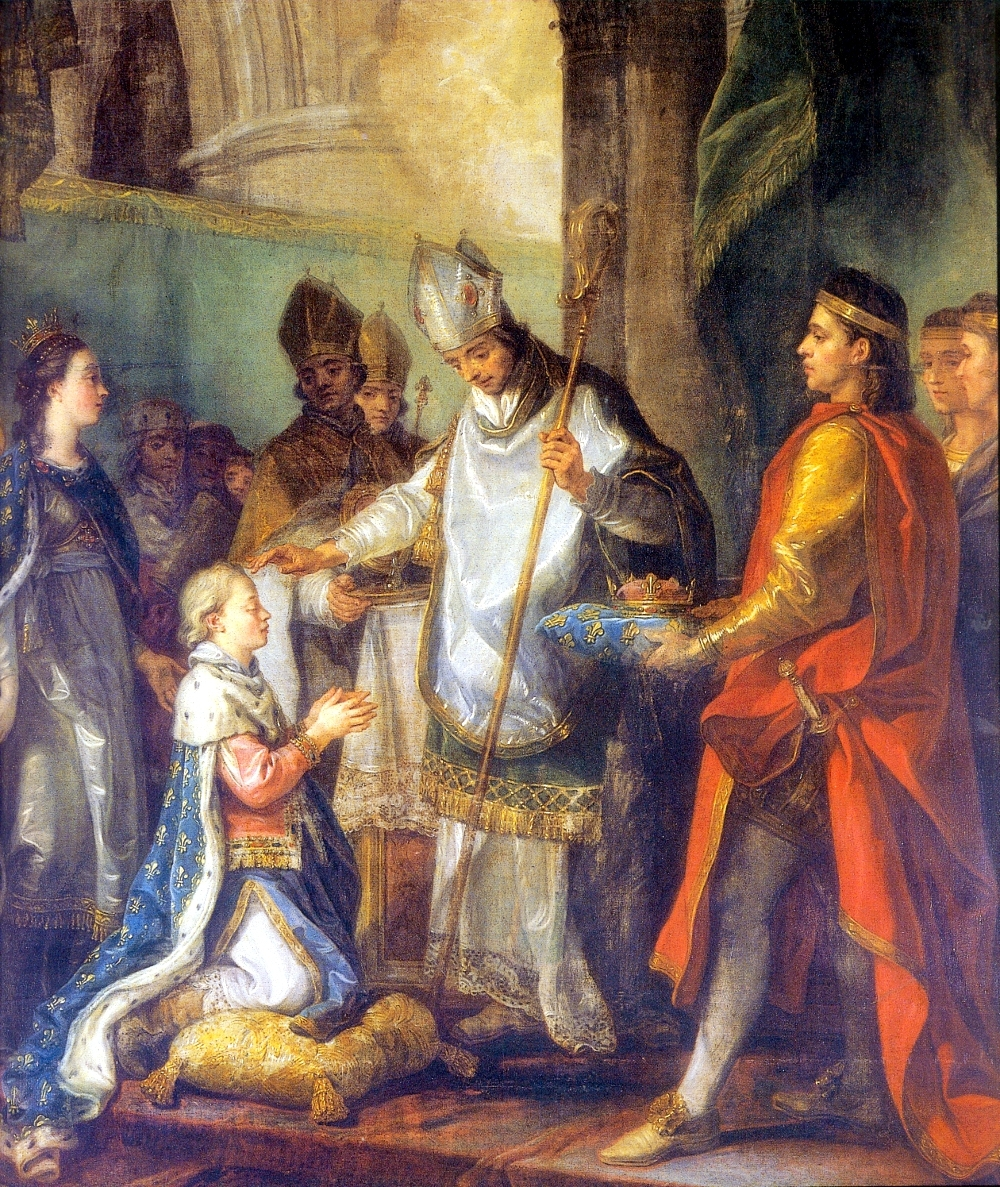
The Coronation of Saint Louis by Charles-Amédée-Philippe van Loo

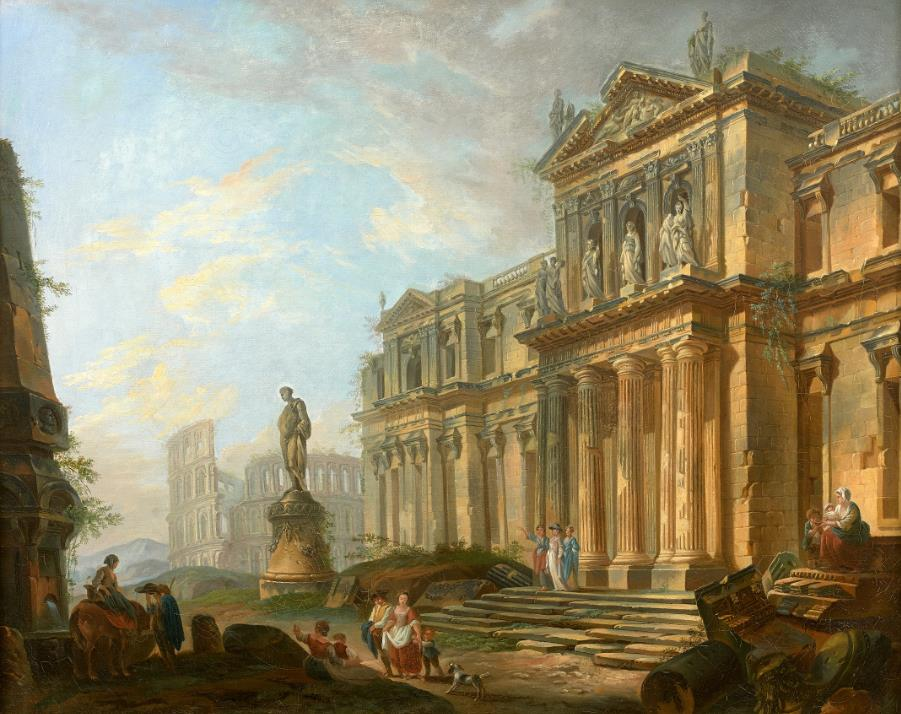
Ruines du vieux chateau de clagny by Pierre-Antoine Demachy

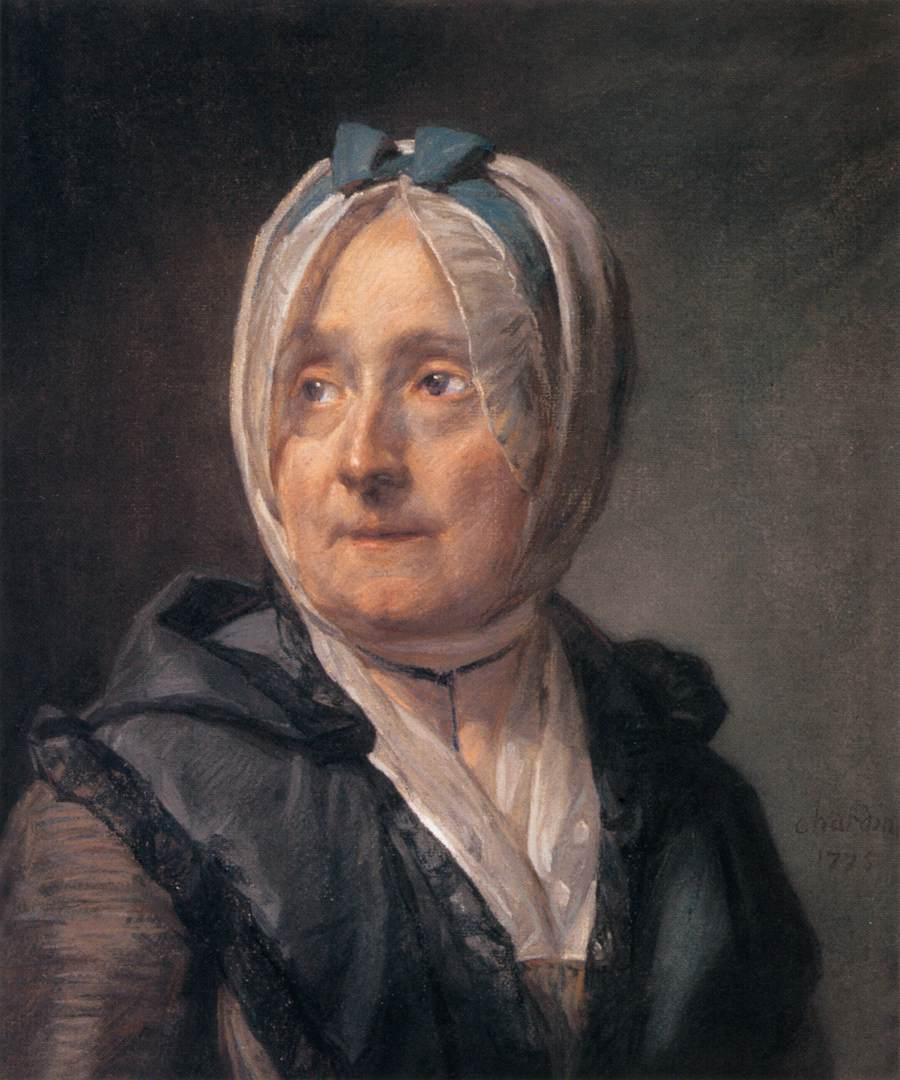
Portrait of Madame Chardin by Jean Siméon Chardin

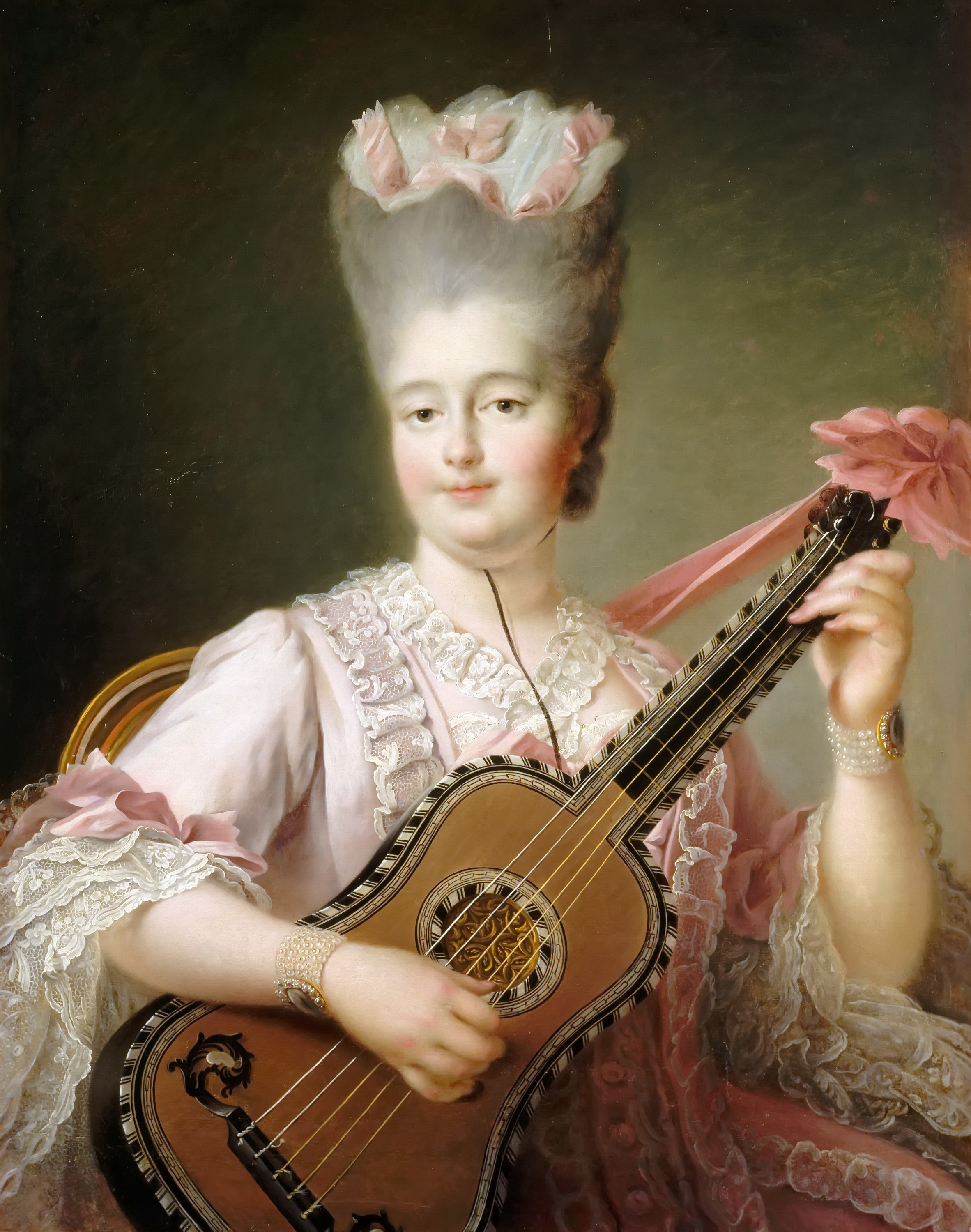
Portrait of Clotilde of France by François-Hubert Drouais

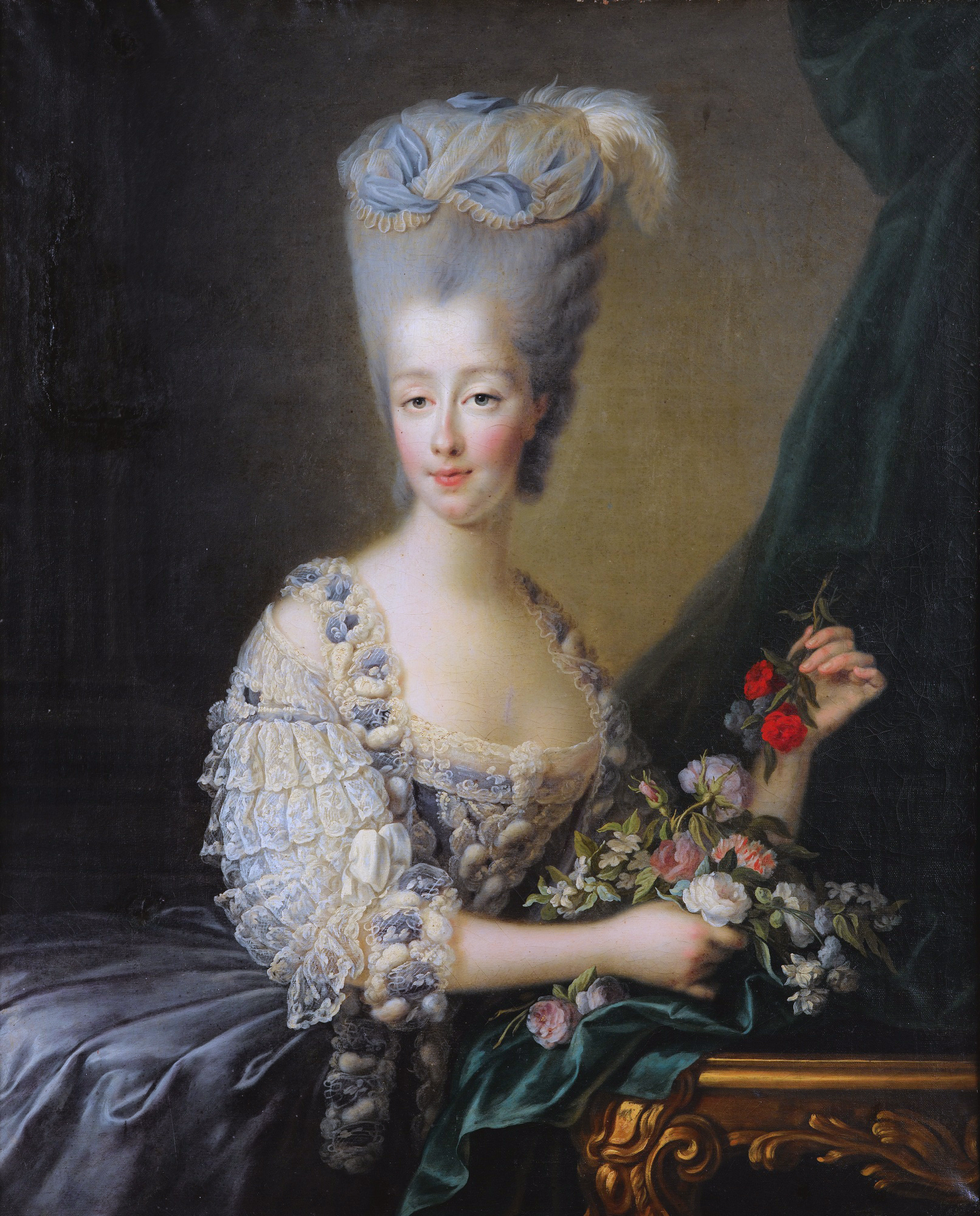
Portrait of Maria Theresa of Savoy by François-Hubert Drouais

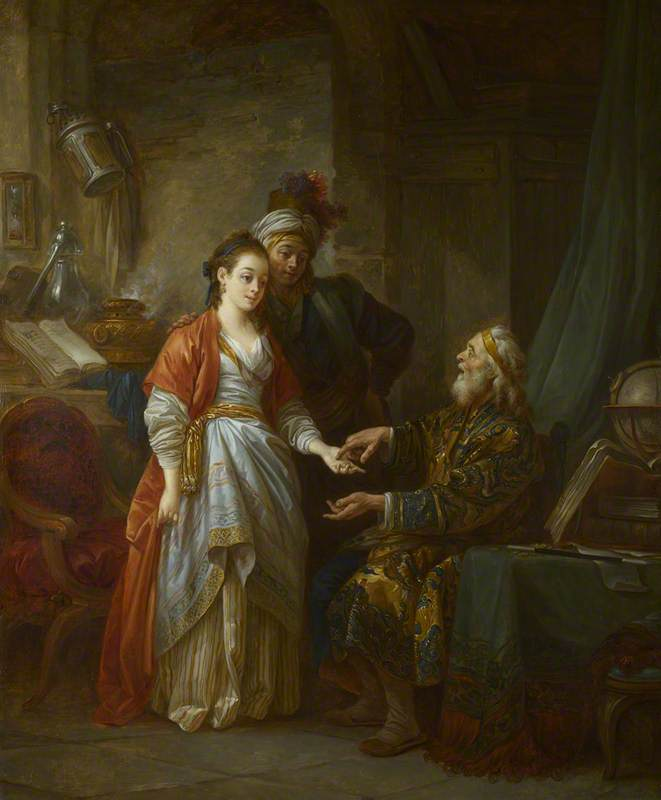
The Necromancer by Jean-Baptiste Le Prince

The Return of Belisarius by Louis Jean-Jacques Durameau

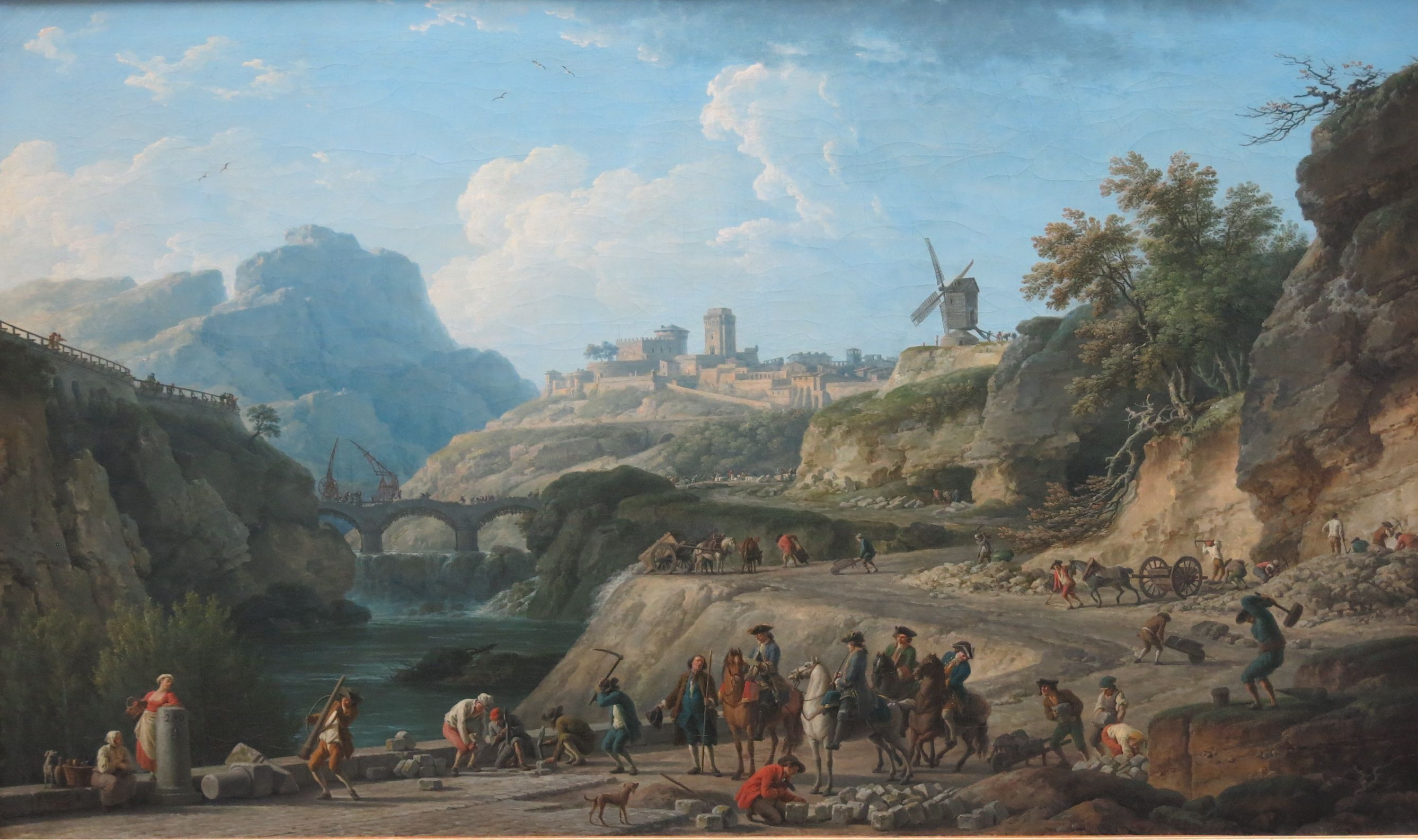
Constructing a Main Road by Joseph Vernet

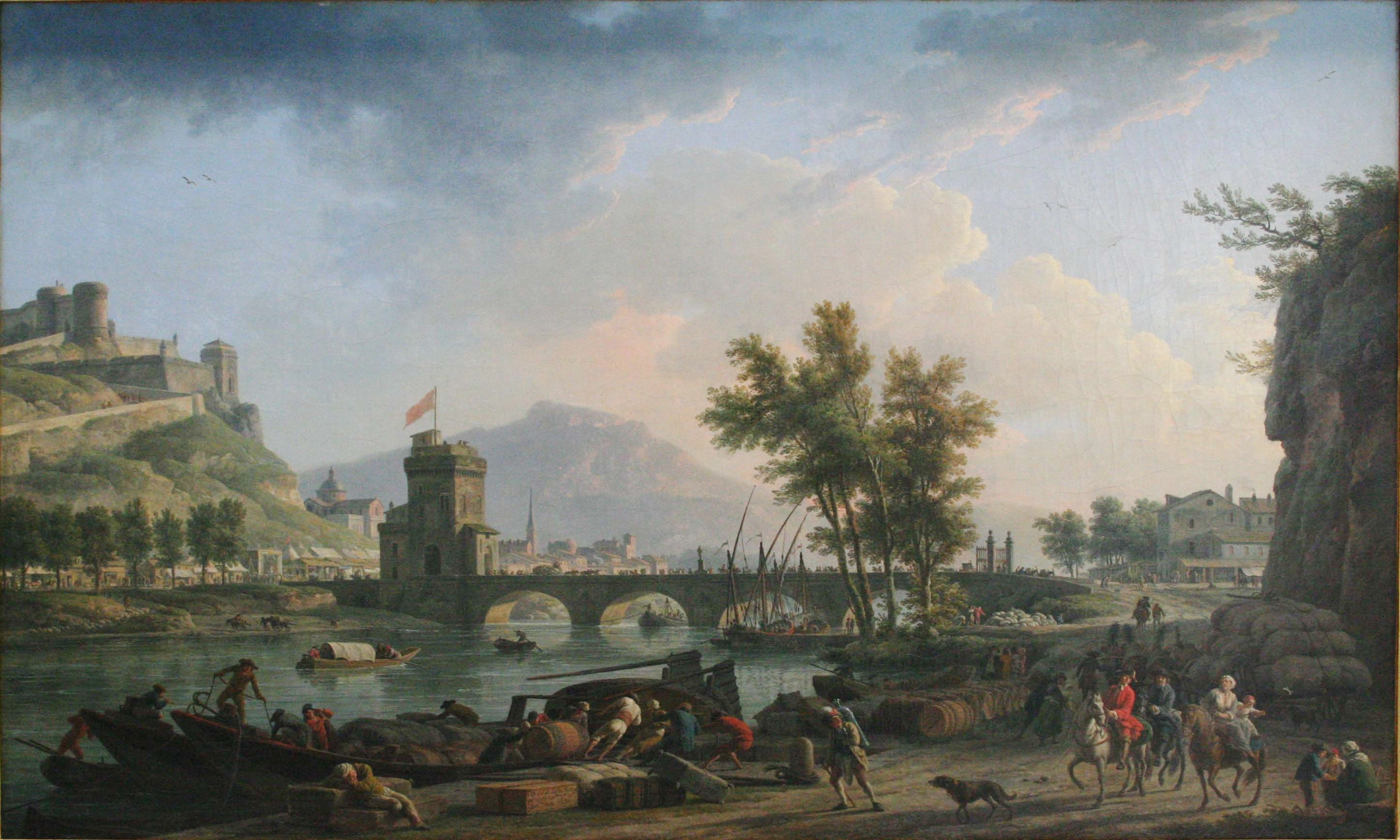
The Approach to a Fair by Joseph Vernet

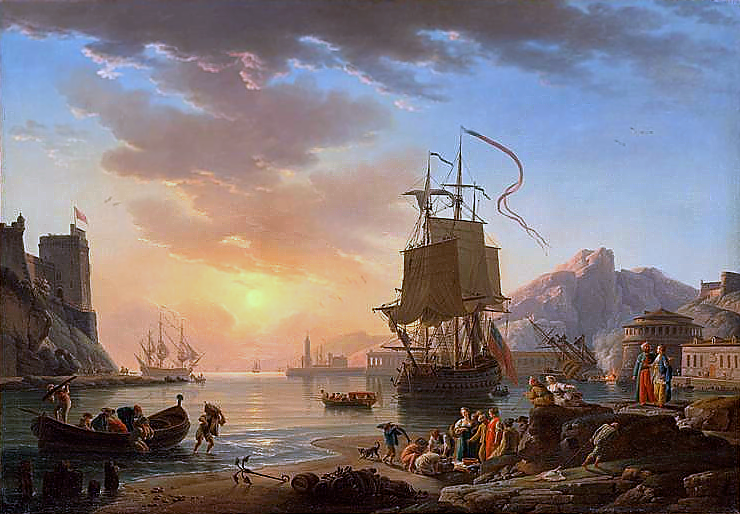
Marine, Sunset by Joseph Vernet

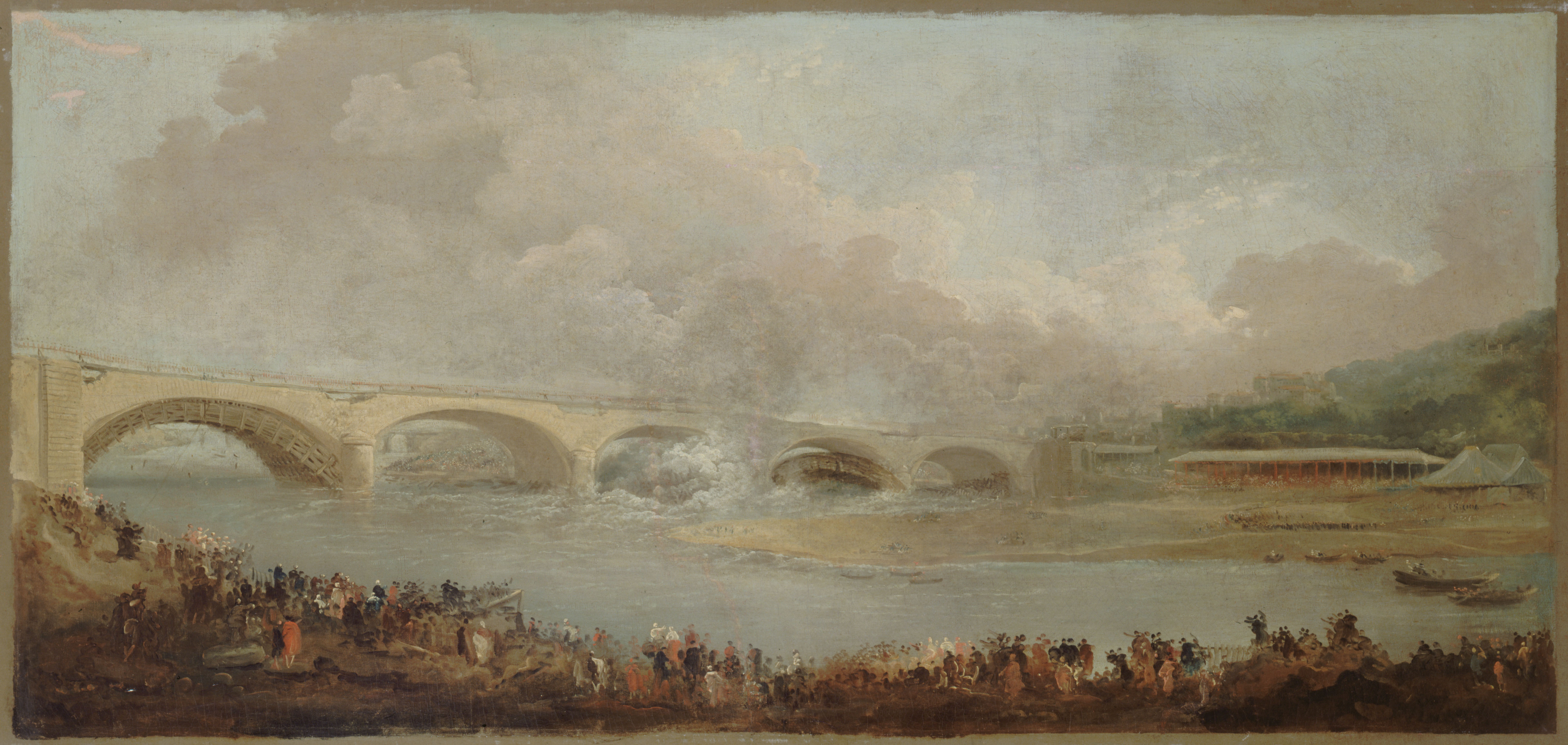
Sketch for Le décintrement du pont de Neuilly by Hubert Robert

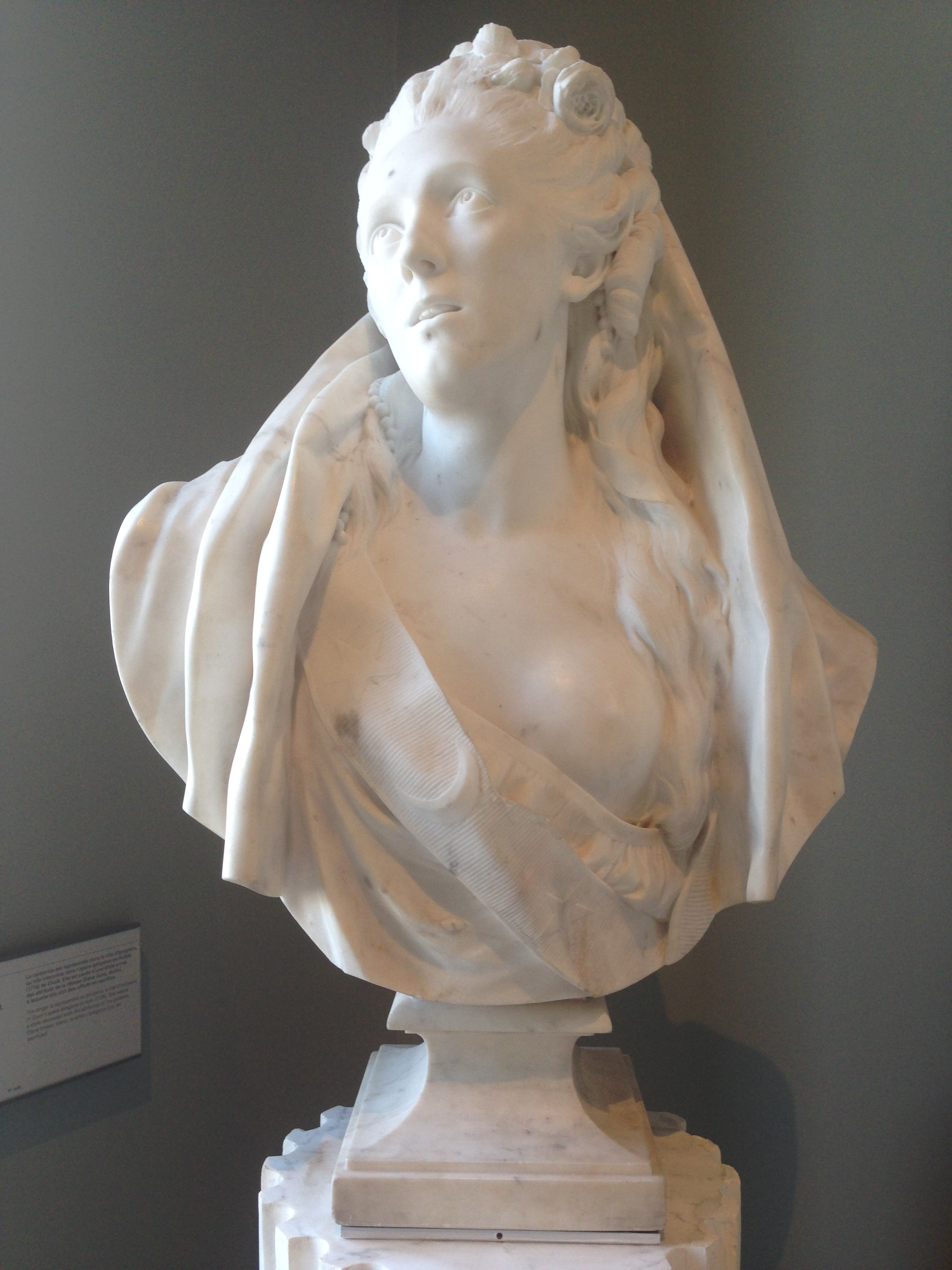
Sophie Arnould by Jean-Antoine Houdon

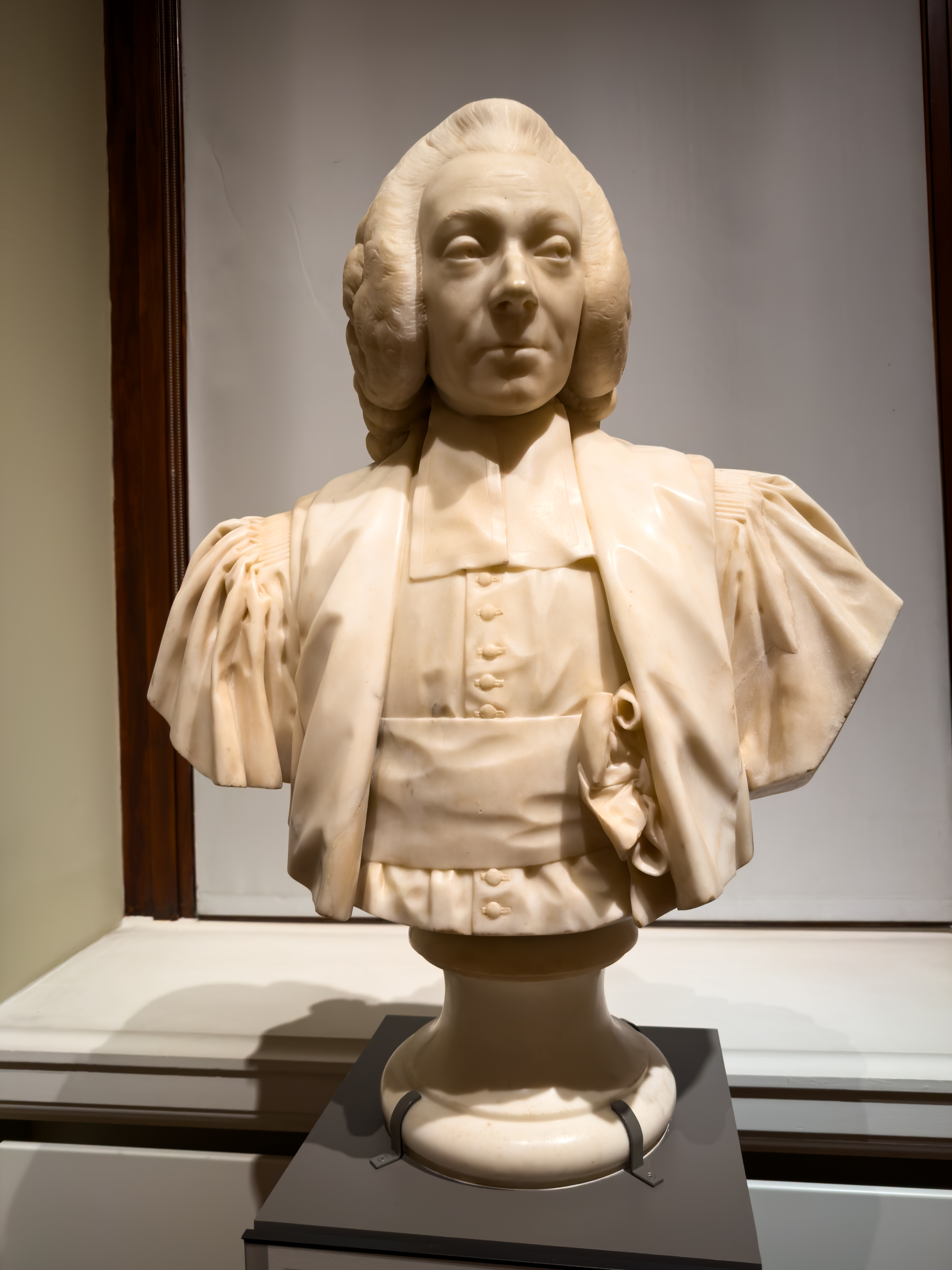
Marquis de Miromesnil by Jean-Antoine Houdon

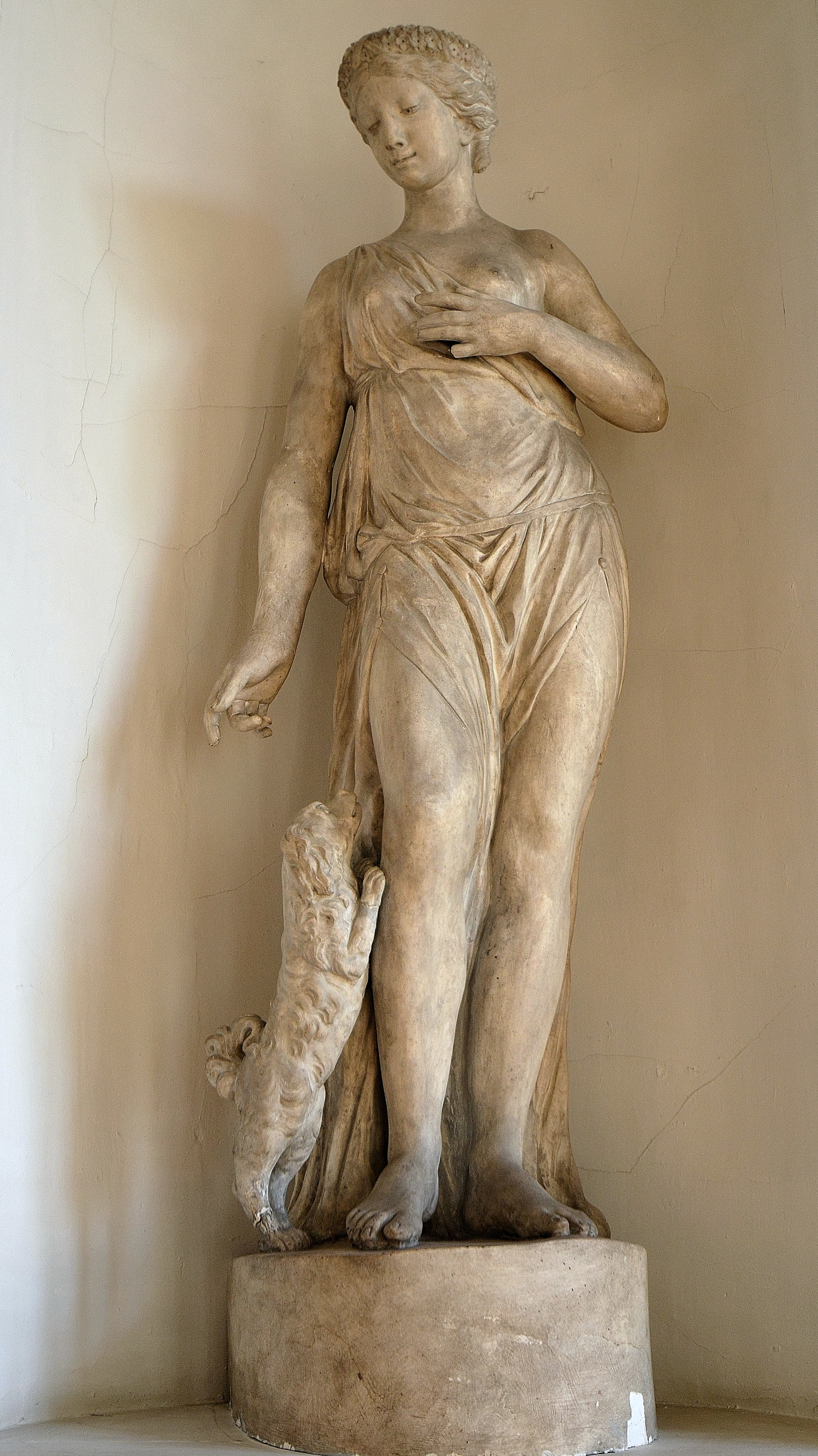
La Fidélité by Charles-Antoine Bridan

== Bibliography ==
- Bailey, Colin B. The Age of Watteau, Chardin, and Fragonard: Masterpieces of French Genre Painting. Yale University Press, 2003.
- Bailey, Colin C. (ed.) The Loves of the Gods: Mythological Painting from Watteau to David. Kimbell Art Museum, 2007.
- Baetjer, Katharine. French Paintings in The Metropolitan Museum of Art from the Early Eighteenth Century through the Revolution. Metropolitan Museum of Art, 2019.
- Levey, Michael. Painting and Sculpture in France, 1700–1789. Yale University Press, 1993.
- Poulet, Anne L. Jean-Antoine Houdon: Sculptor of the Enlightenment. University of Chicago Press, 2003.
