= Portrait of Louis-Claude Vassé =

Painting by Étienne Aubry

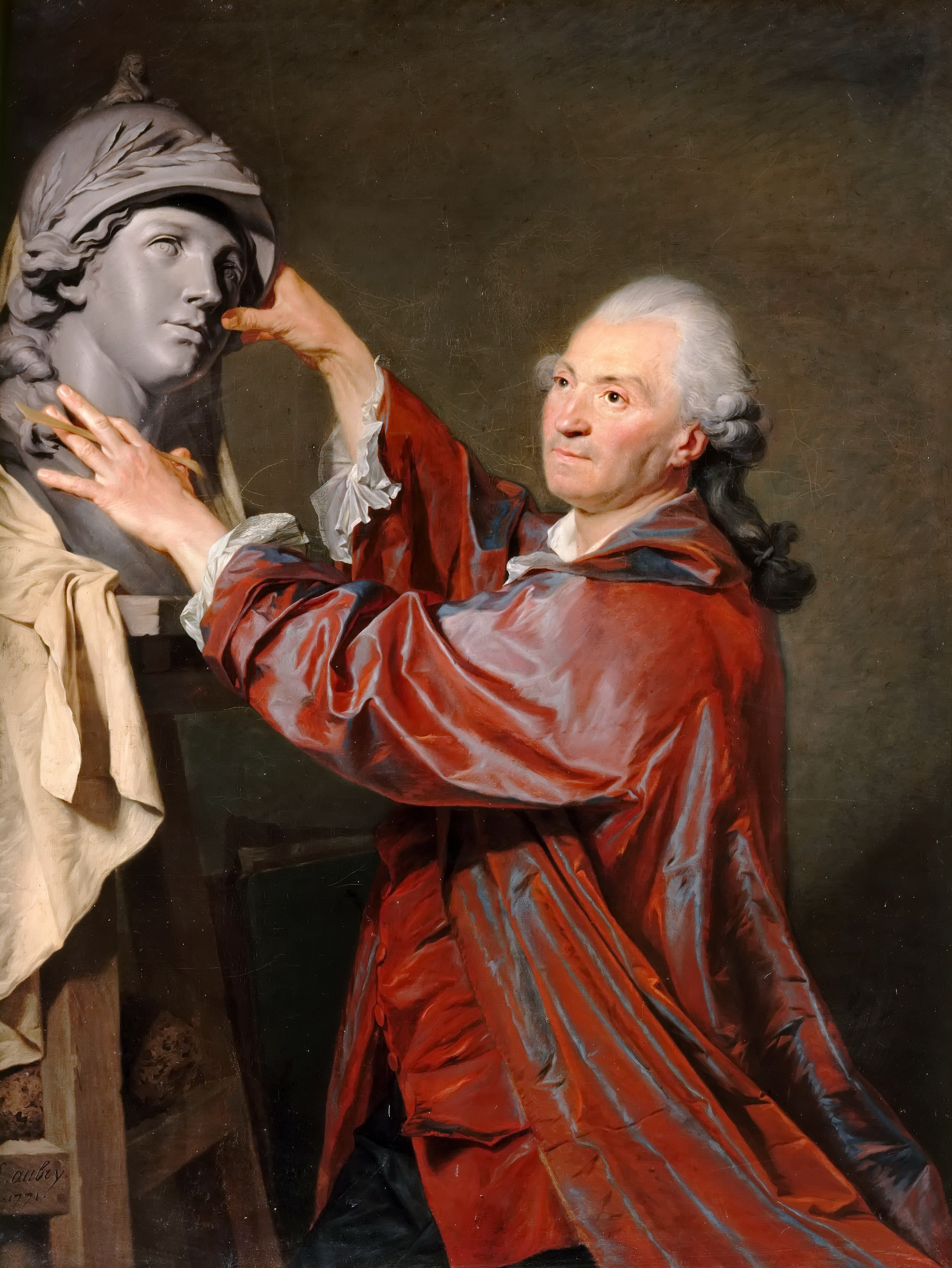
- Artist: Étienne Aubry
- Year: 1771
- Type: Oil on canvas, portrait painting
- Dimensions: 130 cm × 97 cm (51 in × 38 in)
- Location: Palace of Versailles; Versailles

Portrait of Louis-Claude Vassé is a 1771 portrait painting by the French artist Étienne Aubry. It depicts the celebrated sculptor Louis-Claude Vassé. He is shown at work on a bust of the Ancient Roman goddess Minerva. The painting was exhibited at the Salon of 1773 held at the Louvre in Paris. Acquired by the Louvre, it has been on long-term loan to the Palace of Versailles along with another of his works Portrait of Noël Hallé since 1921.

== Bibliography ==
- Curtis, Penelope. On the Meanings of Sculpture in Painting. Henry Moore Institute, 2009.
- Lichtenstein, Jacqueline. The Blind Spot: An Essay on the Relations Between Painting and Sculpture in the Modern Age. Getty Research Institute, 2008.
