= Louis-Claude Vassé =

French sculptor

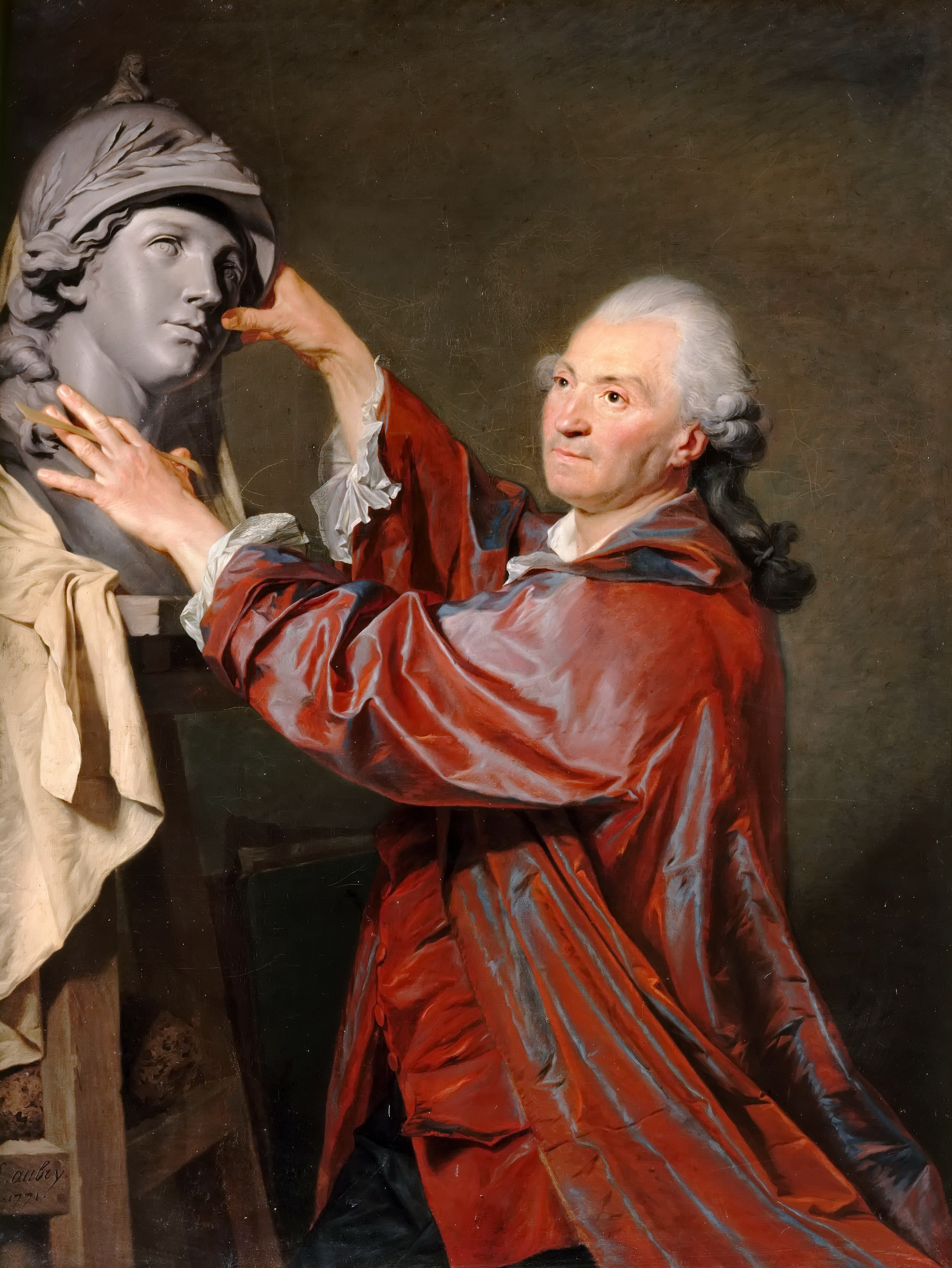
Portrait of Louis-Claude Vassé by Étienne Aubry, 1771

Louis Claude Vassé (1717 in Paris – 1772) was a French sculptor. He was the son and grandson of sculptors and a pupil of Edmé Bouchardon. He won the Prix de Rome and later became a member of the Académie royale de peinture et de sculpture. Among his best known works is the tomb of Stanislas Leszczyński at Nancy in the Église Notre-Dame-de-Bon-Secours.

== Gallery ==
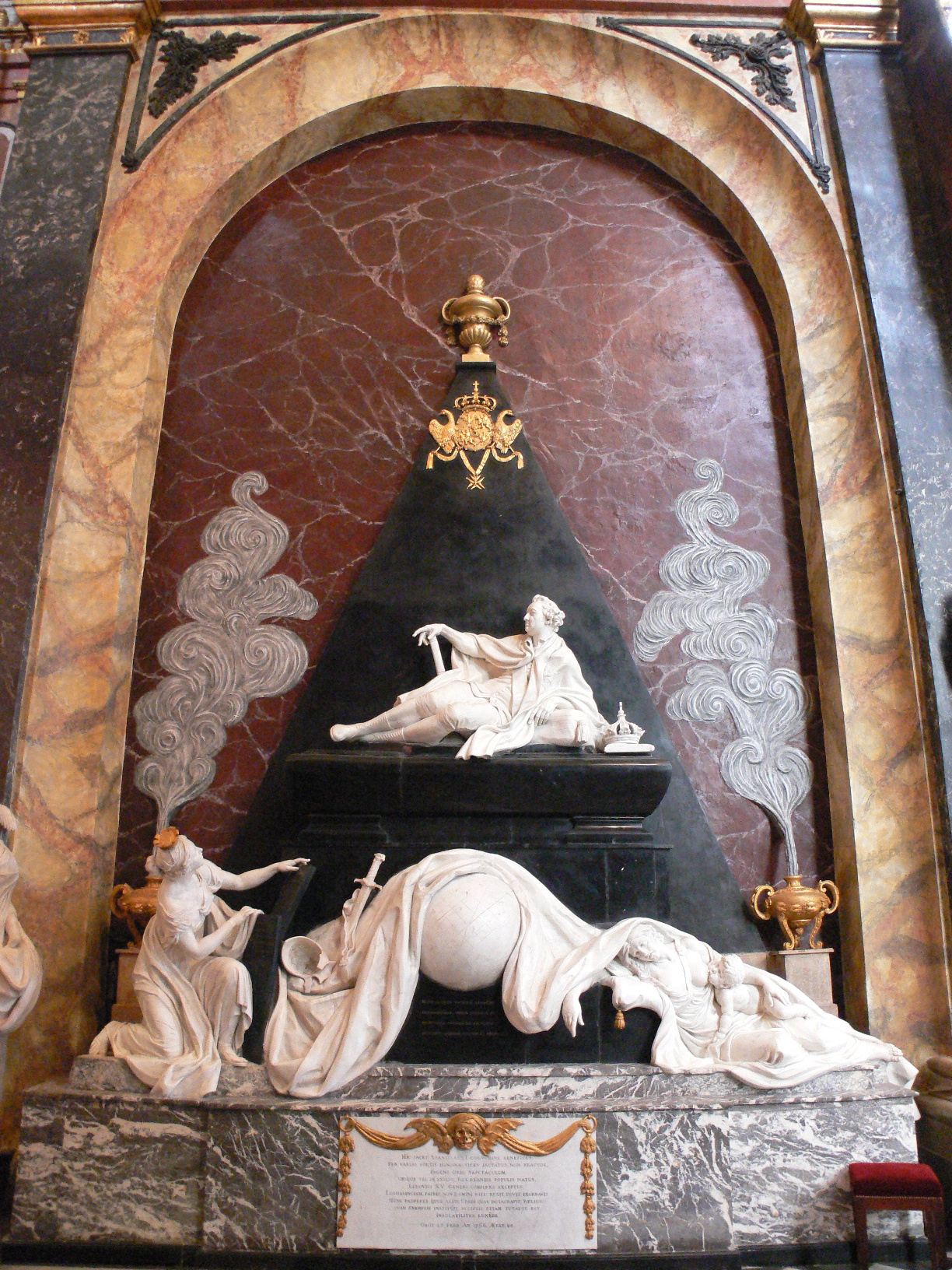
Tomb of Stanislas Leszczynski at Église Notre-Dame-de-Bon-Secours, Nancy

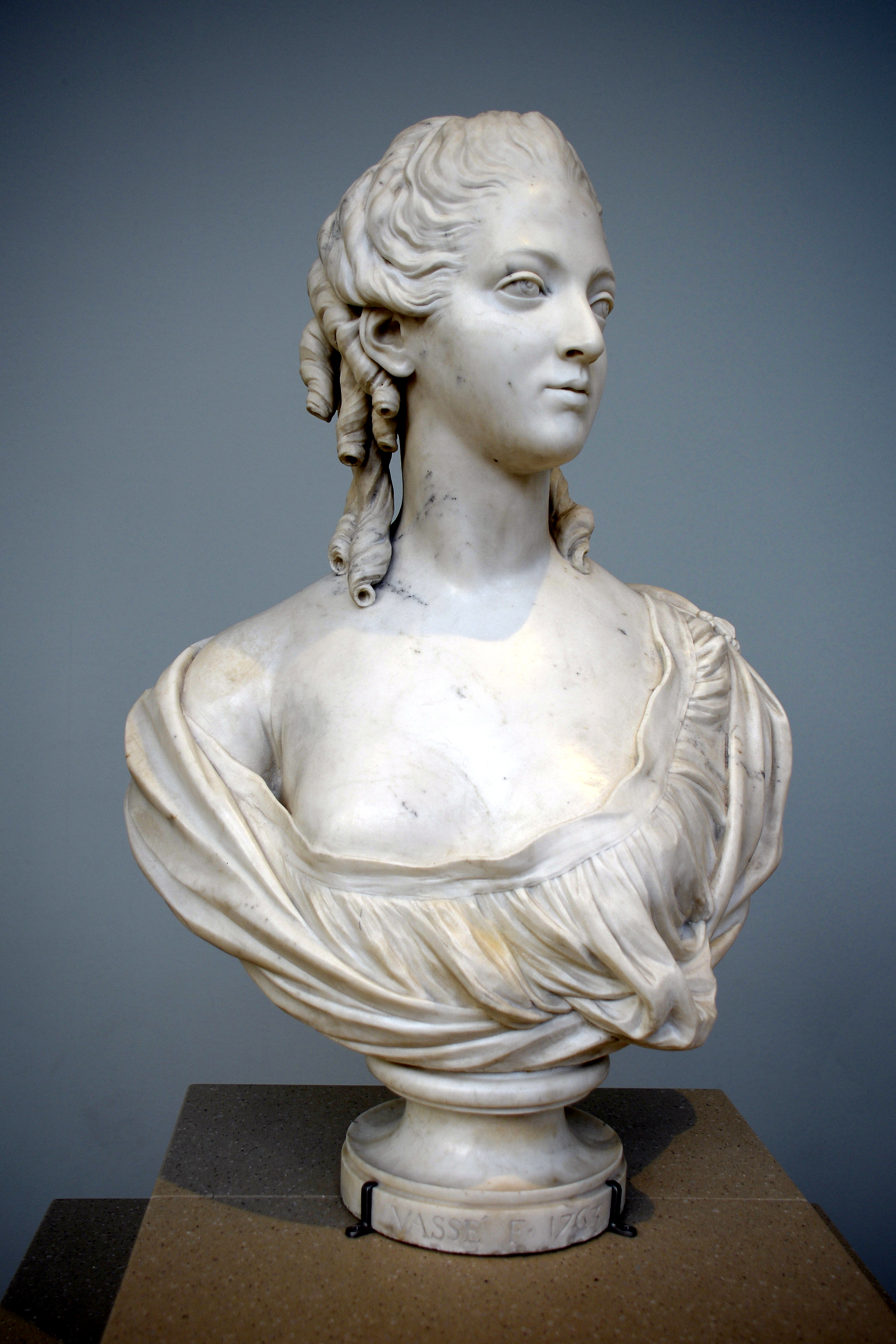
Marble bust of Madame Victoire, by Louis-Claude Vasse, 1763, Paris. France. National Museum of Scotland, Edinburgh
