= Constructing a Main Road =

Painting by Claude-Joseph Vernet

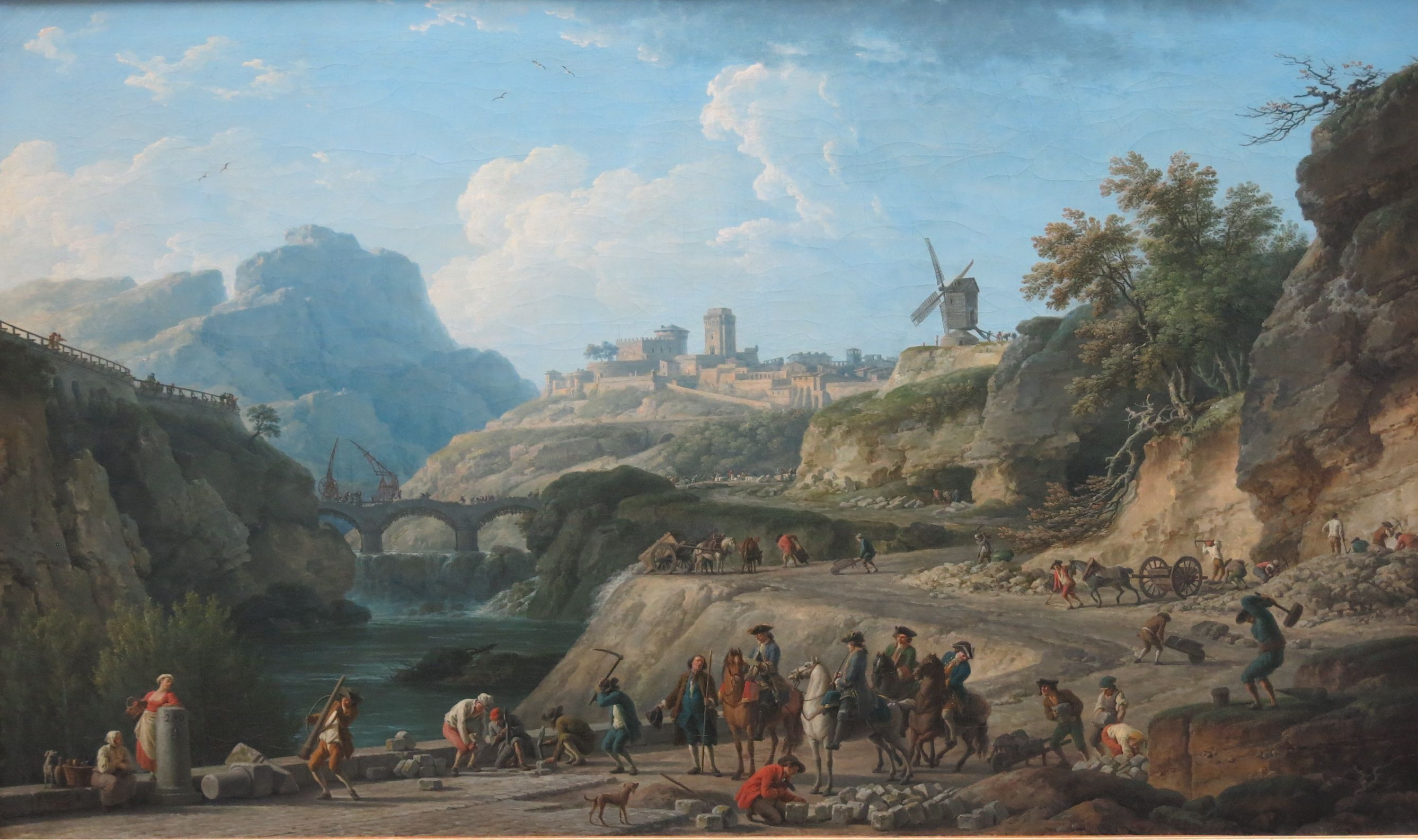
- Artist: Claude-Joseph Vernet
- Year: 1774
- Type: Oil on canvas, landscape painting
- Dimensions: 97 cm × 162 cm (38 in × 64 in)
- Location: Louvre; Paris

Constructing a Main Road (French: La Construction d'un grand chemin) is a 1774 oil painting by the French artist Claude-Joseph Vernet. Combining landscape painting and genre painting, it depicts workers constructing a major highway through a river valley. The celebrated engineer Jean-Rodolphe Perronet is shown on horseback in the centre of the painting.

It was one of a pair of pictures commissioned from Vernet by the Controller-General of Finances Joseph Marie Terray along with The Approach to a Fair. In his government position, Terray was in charge of overseeing road construction which likely led to the subject of this work. The painting was displayed at the Salon of 1775 at the Louvre in Paris. The work was acquired for the Louvre in 1816. Its companion piece is now in the Musée Fabre.

== Bibliography ==
- Bailey, Colin B. The Age of Watteau, Chardin, and Fragonard: Masterpieces of French Genre Painting. Yale University Press, 2003.
- Conisbee, Philip. French Genre Painting in the Eighteenth Century. National Gallery of Art, 2007.
