= The Approach to a Fair =

Painting by Claude-Joseph Vernet

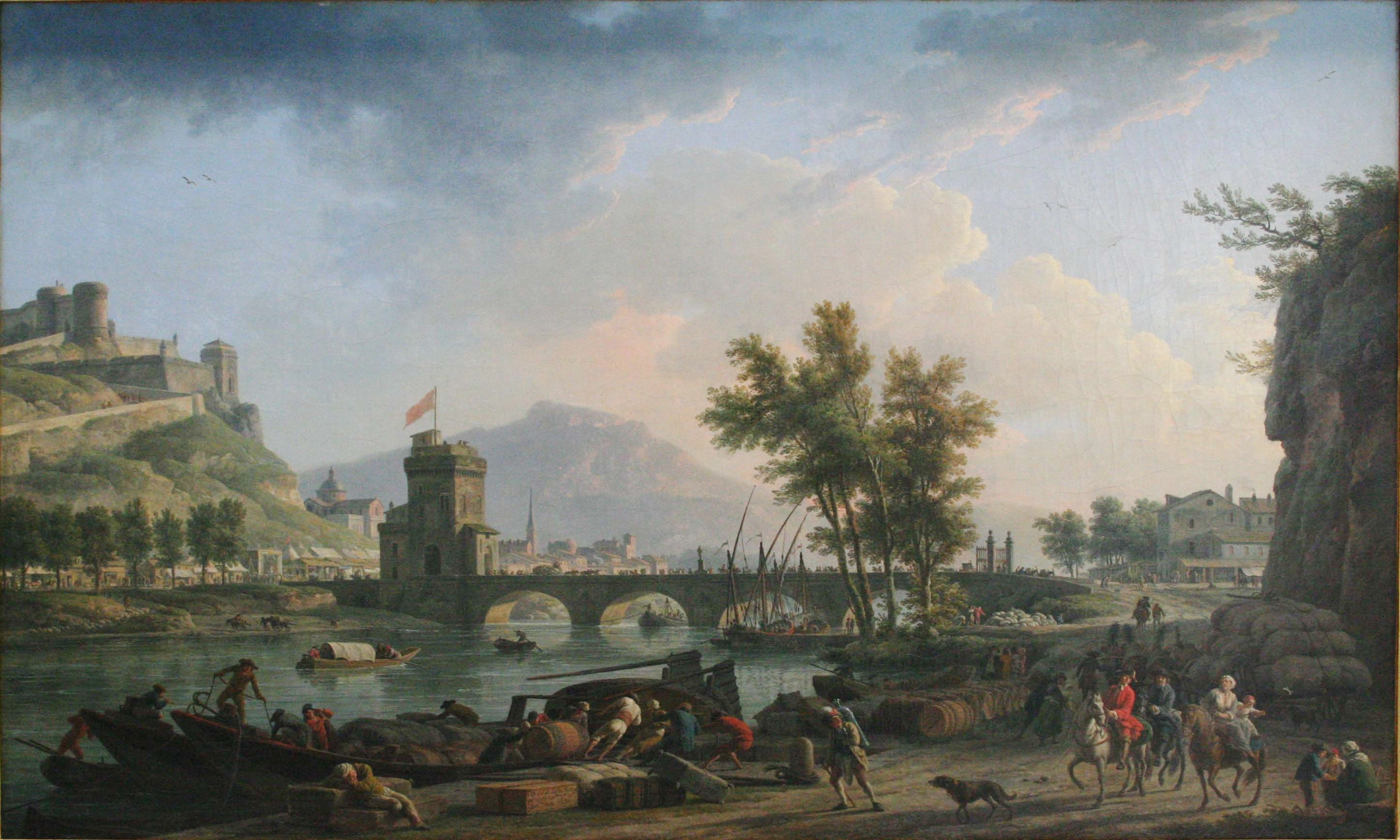
- Artist: Claude-Joseph Vernet
- Year: 1774
- Type: Oil on canvas, landscape painting
- Dimensions: 98 cm × 163 cm (39 in × 64 in)
- Location: Musée Fabre, Montpellier

The Approach to a Fair (French: Les abords d'une foire) is a 1774 landscape painting by the French artist Claude-Joseph Vernet. It depicts a view on the Rhône near the town of Beaucaire in southern France during its fair.

It was one of a pair of pictures commissioned from Vernet by the Controller-General of Finances Joseph Marie Terray along with its pendant Constructing a Main Road. Both paintings were exhibited at the Salon of 1775 at the Louvre in Paris. Today the painting is in the collection of the Musée Fabre in Montpellier, having been acquired in 1837.

== Bibliography ==
- Bailey, Colin C. Patriotic Taste: Collecting Modern Art in Pre-revolutionary Paris. Yale University Press, 2002.
- Bailey, Colin B. The Age of Watteau, Chardin, and Fragonard: Masterpieces of French Genre Painting. Yale University Press, 2003.
- Conisbee, Philip. French Genre Painting in the Eighteenth Century. National Gallery of Art, 2007.
