= Portrait of Maria Theresa of Savoy =

Painting by François-Hubert Drouais

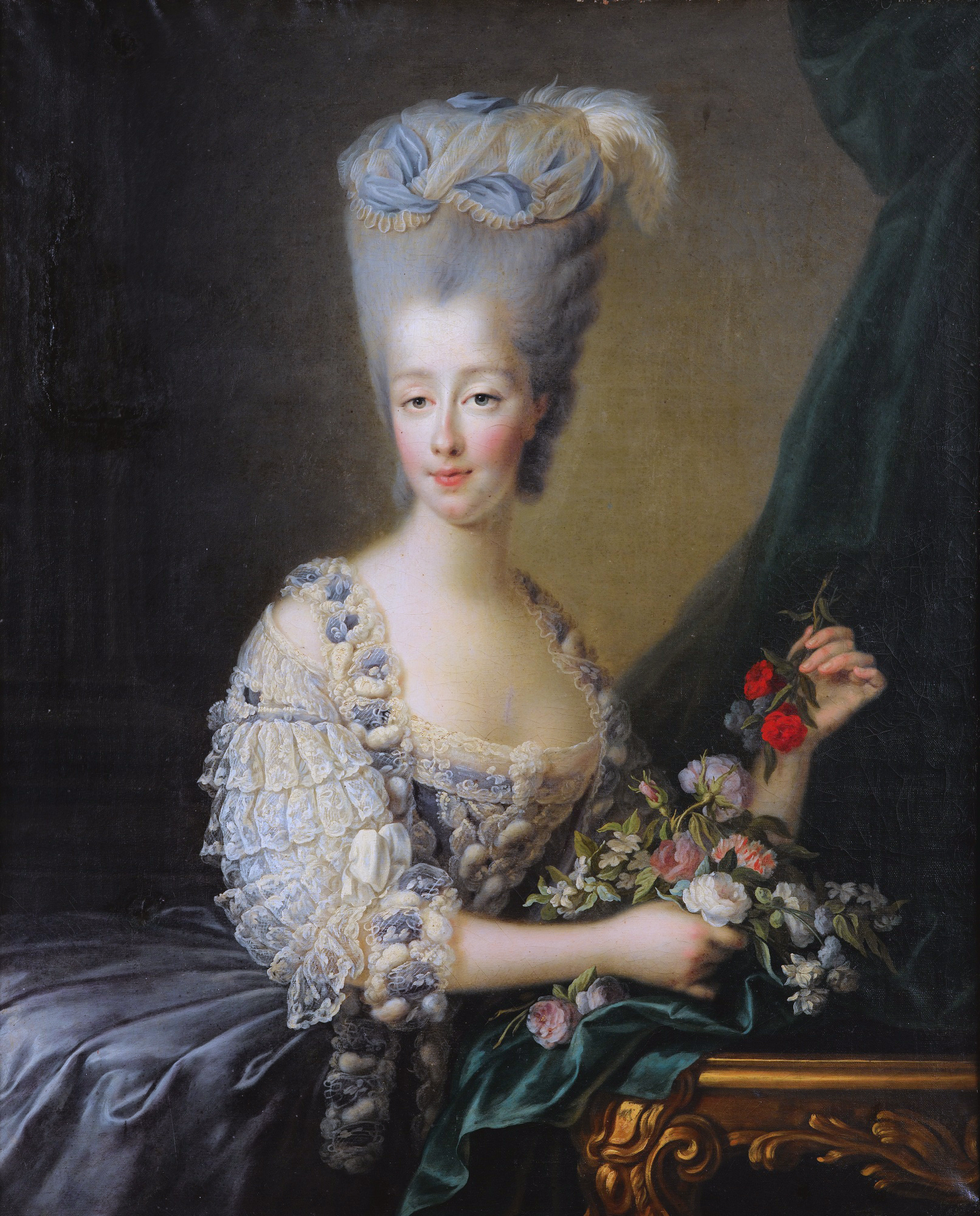
- Artist: François-Hubert Drouais
- Year: 1775
- Type: Oil on canvas, portrait painting
- Dimensions: 98.5 cm × 78 cm (38.8 in × 31 in)
- Location: Palace of Versailles; Paris

Portrait of Maria Theresa of Savoy (French: Portrait de Marie-Thérèse de Savoie) is an oil on canvas portrait painting by the French artist François-Hubert Drouais, from 1775. It is held at the Palace of Versailles, in Paris.

== History ==
It depicts Maria Theresa of Savoy, a member of the French royal family of the Ancien régime era. The daughter of Victor Amadeus III of Savoy, the Turin-born Maria Theresa married Count of Artois in 1773 in a dynastic match. Her husband was a younger brother of Louis XVI, and the couple went into exile after the French Revolution. Some years after her death in Graz, in 1805, her husband inherited the French throne in 1824, during the Bourbon Restoration.

The painting was exhibited at the Salon of 1775 at the Louvre, the last before the death of Drouais later that year. A contemporary replica of the original by Drouais was auctioned at Sotheby's in 2015. It was acquired for the Palace of Versailles.

A print based on the painting was produced by the engraver Louis Jacques Cathelin, in 1777.

== Bibliography ==
- Arizzoli-Clémentel, Pierre & Salmon, Xavier. Marie-Antoinette Exposition. Galeries nationales du Grand Palais, 2008.
- Bell, Jeffrey. Industrialization and Imperialism, 1800-1914: A Biographical Dictionary. ABC-CLIO, 2002.
