= Paternal Love =

Painting by Étienne Aubry

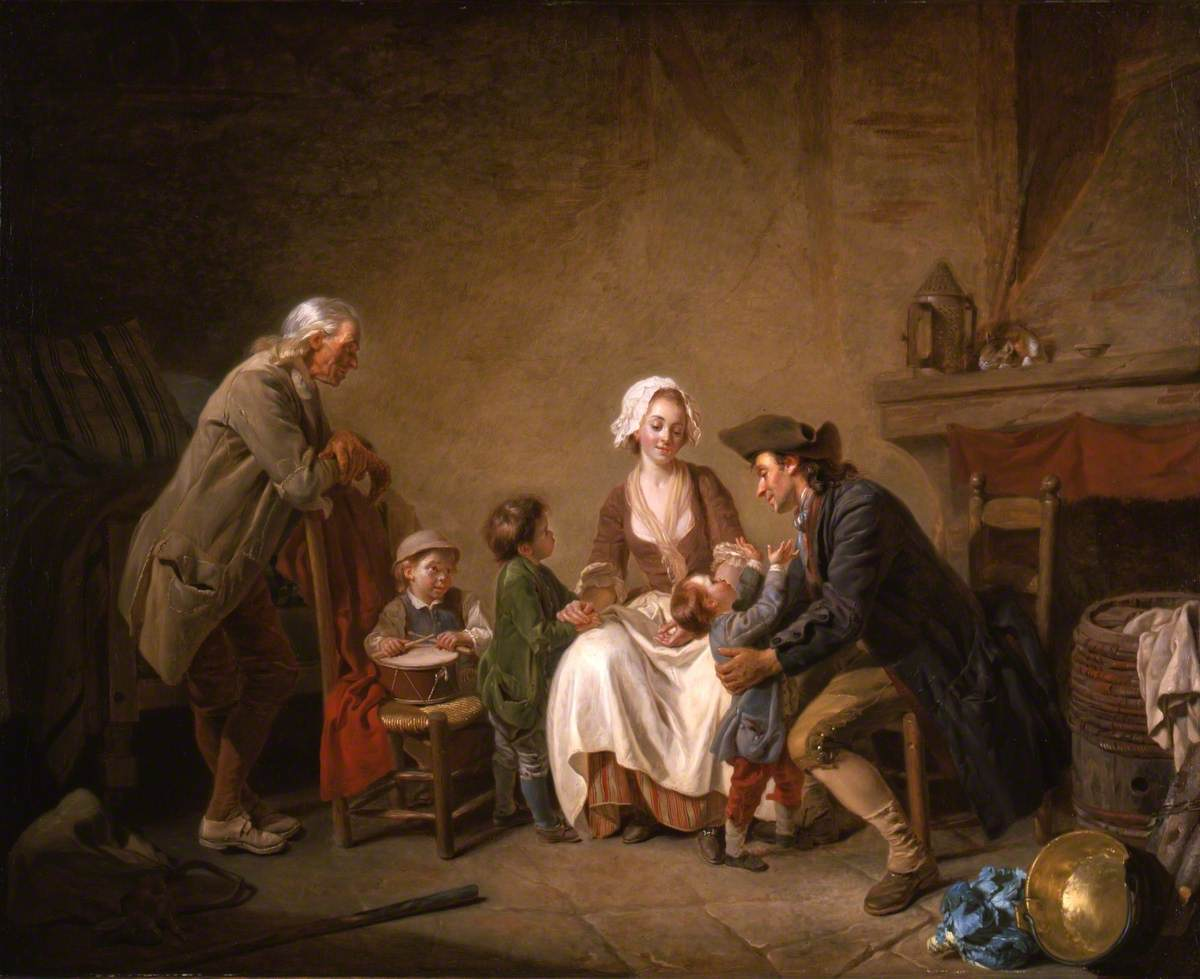
- Artist: Étienne Aubry
- Year: 1775
- Type: Oil on canvas, genre painting
- Dimensions: 78.7 cm × 101.6 cm (31.0 in × 40.0 in)
- Location: Barber Institute of Fine Arts; Birmingham

Paternal Love (French: L'Amour paternel) is a 1775 genre painting by the French artist Étienne Aubry. It shows three generations of a family gathered around the hearth in a comparatively modest dwelling. It is a celebration of family life, part of the "moral genre" style of paintings, and celebrates ordinary life rather than that of the upper classes or aristocracy.

It was displayed at the Salon of 1775 held at the Louvre in Paris where it was praised for its naturalism. Today the painting is part of the collection of the Barber Institute of Fine Arts in Birmingham which acquired it in 1962.

== Bibliography ==
- Bailey, Colin B. The Age of Watteau, Chardin, and Fragonard: Masterpieces of French Genre Painting. Yale University Press, 2003.
- Conisbee, Philip. French Genre Painting in the Eighteenth Century. National Gallery of Art, 2007.
- Gutwirth, Madelyn. The Twilight of the Goddesses: Women and Representation in the French Revolutionary Era. Rutgers University Press, 1992.
- Wakefield, David. French Eighteenth-Century Painting. Gordon Fraser, 1984.
