= Venus, Wounded by Diomedes, Is Saved by Iris =

Painting by Joseph-Marie Vien

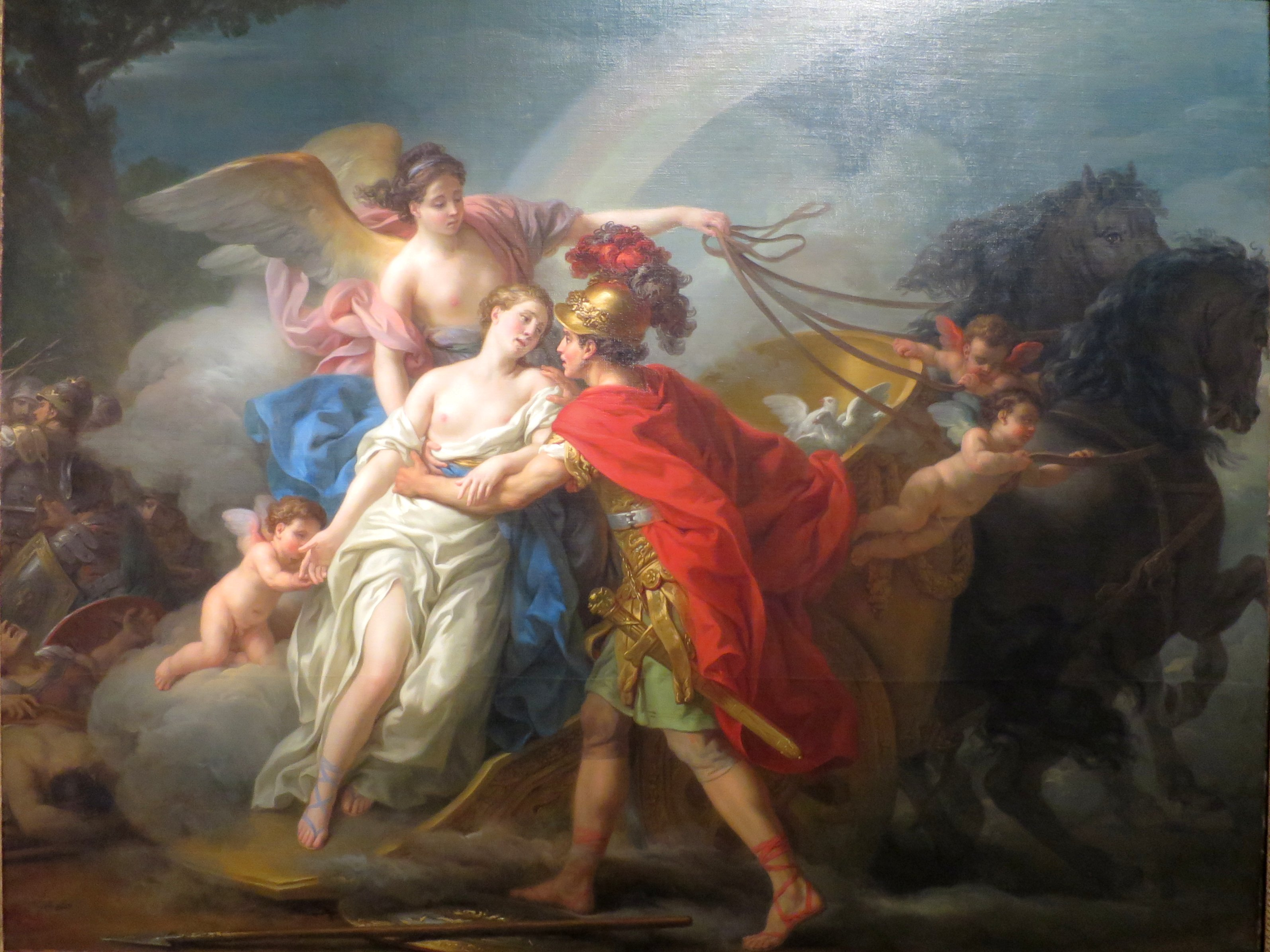
- Artist: Joseph-Marie Vien
- Year: 1775
- Type: Oil on canvas, history painting
- Dimensions: 161.9 cm × 207.6 cm (63.7 in × 81.7 in)
- Location: Columbus Museum of Art, Columbus

Venus, Wounded by Diomedes, Is Saved by Iris is an oil on canvas painting by the French artist Joseph-Marie Vien, from 1775. It is held in the Columbus Museum of Art, in Columbus.

== History and description ==
Inspired by Greek and Roman Mythology, it shows a scene inspired by Homer's Iliad. During the Trojan War, Venus intervenes in the fighting to save her son Aeneas, but is wounded in the arm by the Greek hero Diomedes. She is shown being rescued by Iris in a chariot.

Vien was an important figure of the Neoclassical movement in France. He served as director of the French Academy in Rome between 1775 and 1781 and counted Jacques-Louis David and François-André Vincent amongst his notable pupils.

The painting was exhibited at the Salon of 1775 at the Louvre in Paris. Rather than focus on the raging battle, Vien chose to concentrate the composition on the mythological figures.

== Bibliography ==
- Bailey, Colin C. (ed.) The Loves of the Gods: Mythological Painting from Watteau to David. Kimbell Art Museum, 2007.
- Flick, Gert-Rudolf. Masters & Pupils: The Artistic Succession from Perugino to Manet, 1480-1880. Hogarth Arts, 2008.
- Gaehtgens, Thomas W. & Lugand, Jacques. Joseph-Marie Vien: peintre du roi. Arthena, 1988.
- Stein, Perrin. Jacques Louis David: Radical Draftsman. Metropolitan Museum of Art, 2022.
