= Portrait of Noël Hallé =

Painting by Étienne Aubry

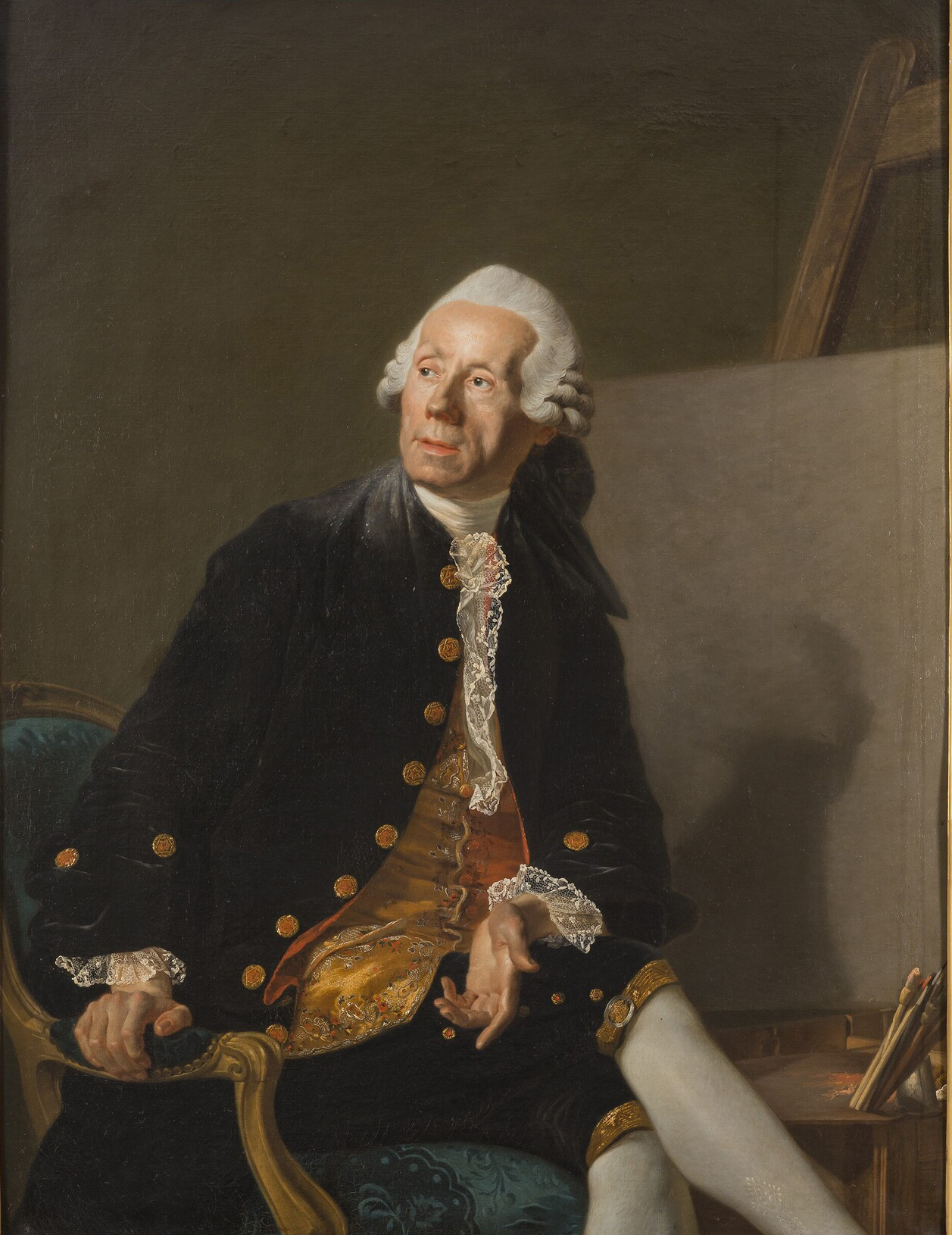
- Artist: Étienne Aubry
- Year: 1775
- Type: Oil on canvas, portrait painting
- Dimensions: 126 cm × 95 cm (50 in × 37 in)
- Location: Palace of Versailles, Versailles

Portrait of Noël Hallé is a 1775 portrait painting by the French artist Étienne Aubry. It depicts the noted history painter Noël Hallé, a long-standing member of the French Royal Academy. Hallé had originally produced works in the rococo style, but towards the end of his career his paintings reflected the growing Neoclassicism. He is shown in elegant, fashionable dress in front of an easel with a canvas, but with his body turned away so that his shadow falls on the canvas.

Aubry was a former student of Joseph-Marie Vien known for his portraits and genre scenes. It was produced as his diploma work for his own admission to the Royal Academy. The painting was exhibited at the Salon of 1775 at the Louvre in Paris. Acquired by the Louvre in 1878, it had been on a long-term loan to the Palace of Versailles since 1921.

== Bibliography ==
- Rosenberg, Pierre (ed.) Une dynastie les Hallé. Arthena, 1995.
