= Armand Thomas Hue de Miromesnil =

French government minister

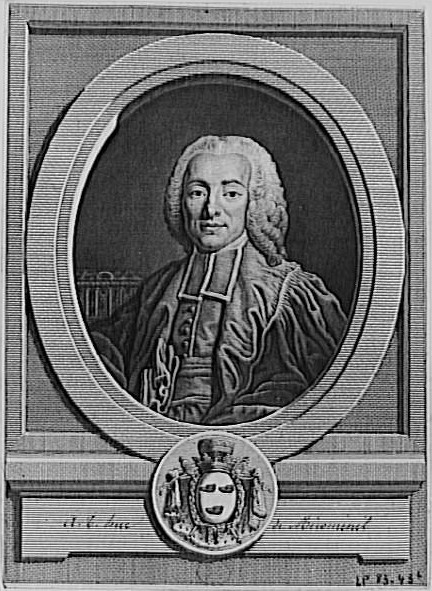
- Hue de Miromesnil, Armand Thomas
- Born: 15 September 1723
- Died: 6 July 1796 (aged 72)
- Occupation: government minister
- Known for: minister of Ancien Régime

Armand Thomas Hue, marquis de Miromesnil (15 September 1723 – 6 July 1796) was a minister of the French Ancien Régime.

He served as Keeper of the Seals under Louis XVI. He was brought into the ministry by his patron Maurepas following the ascension of Louis XVI and the dissolution of the Maupeou ministry, taking office alongside Turgot and Malesherbes.

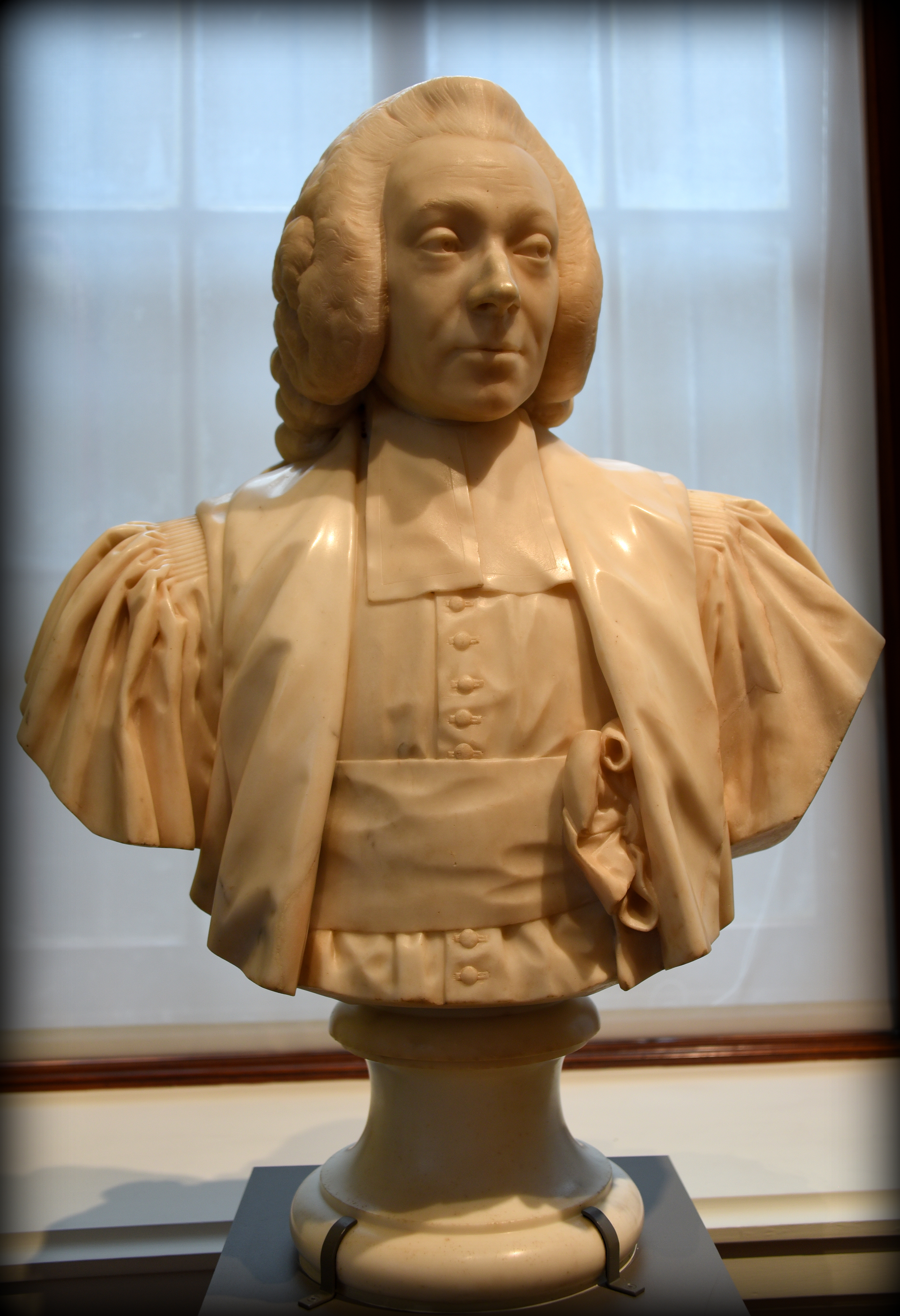
Bust of the Marquis de Miromesnil, 1775 CE. From Paris, France. By Jean-Antoine Houdon. The Victoria and Albert Museum, London

His personal library had 136 medical books, as well as thousands of medical journals and letters on a wide variety of topics from anatomy to midwifery.

== Bibliography ==
- Hue de Miromesnil, Armand Thomas. Correspondence.
