= Étienne Aubry =

French painter

Étienne Aubry (1746–1781) was a French painter. He was born in Versailles. He studied under J. A. Silvestre and Joseph Vien, and soon became noted for his portraits and genre subjects. Aubry exhibited several works of great merit at the Paris Salon, but died at a young age in 1781, the same year that he exhibited the Parting of Coriolanus from his Wife.

== Works ==
Image	Year	English title of work	French title of work	Current location	Notes
	1771	Portrait of Louis-Claude Vassé	Portrait de Louis-Claude Vassé	Versailles, France; Palace of Versailles	
	1773	Portrait of Madame Victoire	Portrait de Madame Victoire	Versailles, France; Palace of Versailles	
	1775	Portrait of Noël Hallé	Portrait de Noël Hallé	Versailles, France; Palace of Versailles	
	17??	Portrait of the actor François René Molé (1734-1807)	Portrait dit de l'acteur François René Molé (1734-1807)	Paris, France; Private collection	
	1775	Paternal Love	L'Amour paternel	Birmingham, England; Barber Institute of Fine Arts	
	1775	The Shepherdess of the Alps	La bergère des Alpes	Detroit, Michigan; Detroit Institute of Arts	
	1776–1777	Farewell to the Wet Nurse	Les adieux à la nourrice	Williamstown, Massachusetts; Clark Art Institute	
	1776	The Broken Marriage	Le Mariage Rompu	Private collection	
	1777	Portrait of Christoph Willibald von Gluck	Portrait de Christoph Willibald von Gluck	Paris, France; The Louvre	
	1777 ca.	Portrait of a Gentleman	Portrait d'un gentilhomme	Oxford, England; Ashmolean Museum	
	1780–81 ca.	Parting of Coriolanus from his Wife	Coriolan quittant sa femme	South Hadley, Massachusetts; Mount Holyoke College Art Museum	
		The Return from the Cave	Le retour de la cave	Marseille, France; Musée des beaux-arts de Marseille	
		The Glass of Wine	Le verre de vin	Paris, France; The Louvre	
		A Girl and Her Cat	Jeune fille et son chat	Private collection	
		An Amorous Couple		Private collection	
