= Virgil Reading the Aeneid to Augustus and Octavia =

1788 painting by Angelica Kauffman

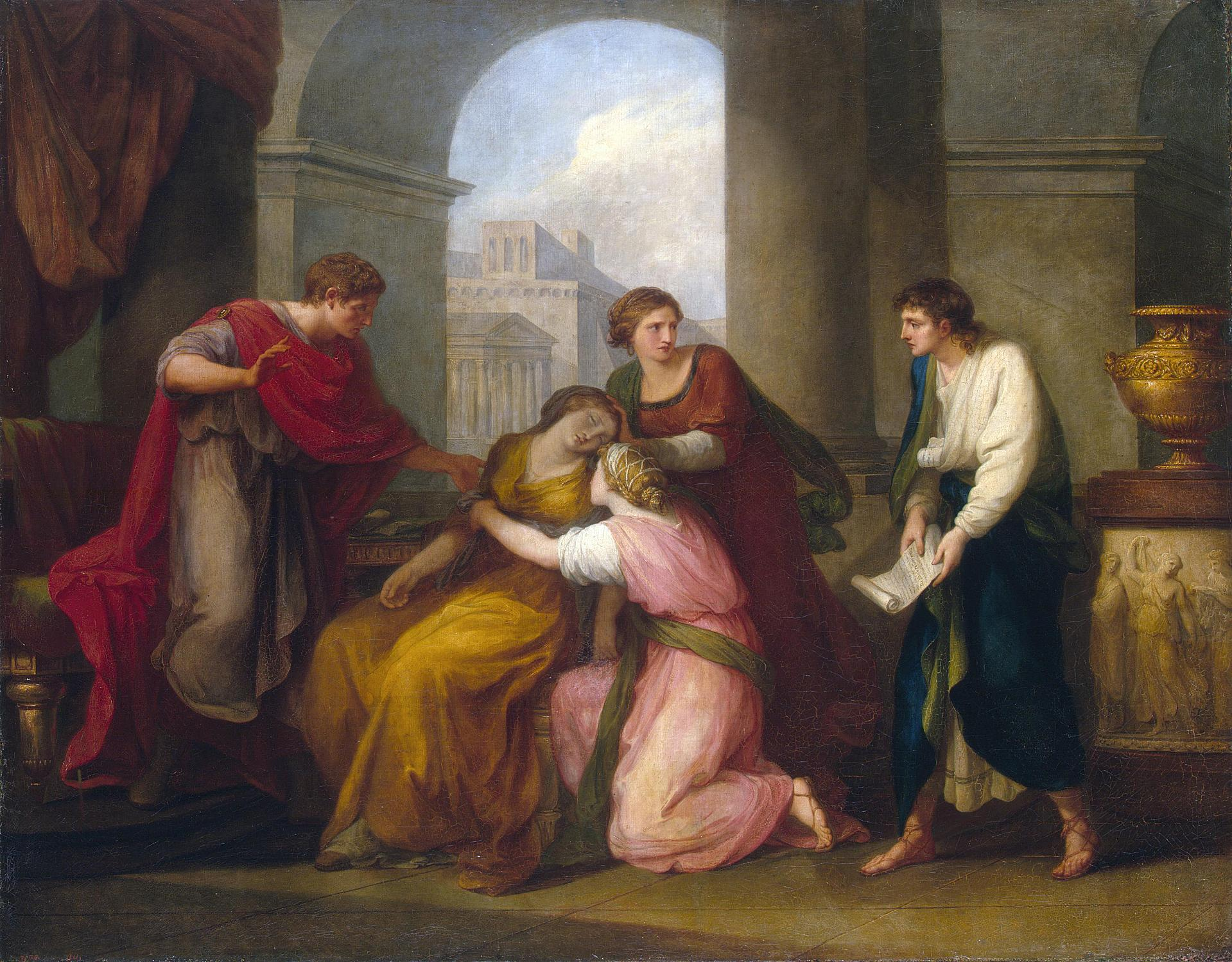
Virgil Reading the Aeneid to Augustus and Octavia (1788) by Angelica Kauffman

Virgil Reading the Aeneid to Augustus and Octavia is an oil on canvas painting by Angelica Kauffman, from 1788. It is held in the Hermitage Museum, in Saint Petersburg, which it entered in 1902. A preparatory study is in the Royal Collection.

It was commissioned by Stanisław August Poniatowski, who kept it in the Lazienki Palace, in Warsaw. It depicts a legend in Macrobius that Octavia the Younger fainted whilst Virgil was reading to her and Augustus a passage about her son Marcellus in the Book VI of his Aeneid.

== See also ==
- Virgil Reading the Aeneid to Augustus and Octavia, a 1787 painting by Jean-Joseph Taillasson

== See also ==
- List of paintings by Angelica Kauffman
