= Giroust =

Giroust is a French surname. Notable people with the surname include:

- François Giroust (1737–1799), French composer
- Jean-Antoine-Théodore Giroust (1753–1817), French painter
- Marie-Suzanne Giroust (1734–1772), French painter, miniaturist, and pastelist
