= The Interior of a Customs House =

Painting by Nicolas Bernard Lépicié

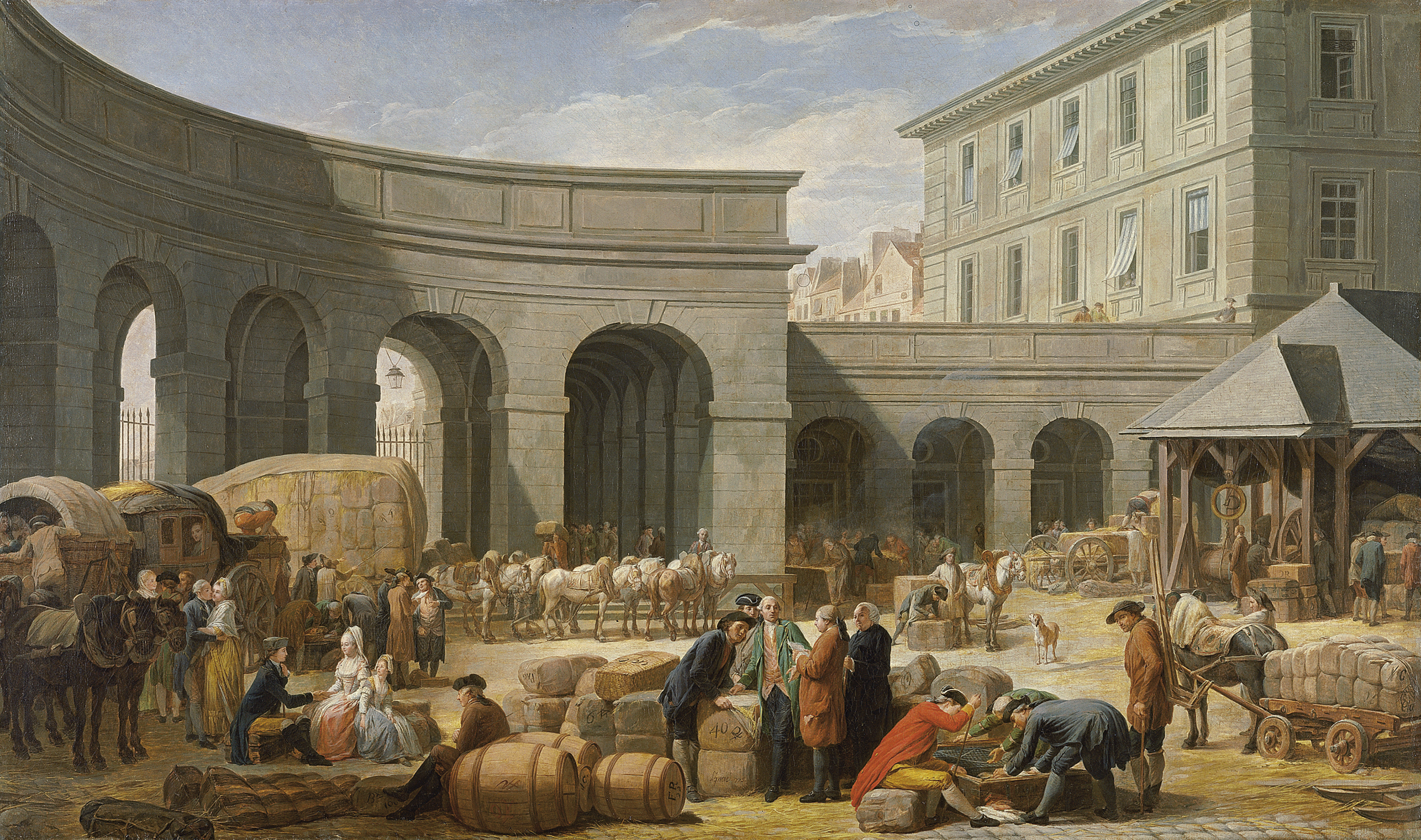
- Artist: Nicolas Bernard Lépicié
- Year: 1775
- Type: Oil on canvas, genre painting
- Dimensions: 98 cm × 164 cm (39 in × 65 in)
- Location: Thyssen-Bornemisza Museum; Madrid

The Interior of a Customs House (French: L'Intérieur d'une douane) is an oil on canvas genre painting by the French artist Nicolas Bernard Lépicié, from 1775.

== History and description ==
It depicts the bustling courtyard of a custom house in Paris. Its grand scale may have been an attempt by Lépicié to blend genre scene with the more prestigious history painting.

The Interior of a Market, 1779

The painting was displayed at the Salon of 1775 at the Louvre in Paris and was enthusiastically praised by the philosopher and art critic Denis Diderot. Today it is in the Thyssen-Bornemisza Museum in Madrid.

Lépicié was also commissioned by the Controller-General of Finances Joseph Marie Terray to produce a companion work for the painting The Interior of a Market which he completed four years later and exhibited at the Salon of 1779.

== Bibliography ==
- Bailey, Colin B. The Age of Watteau, Chardin, and Fragonard: Masterpieces of French Genre Painting. Yale University Press, 2003.
- Conisbee, Philip. French Genre Painting in the Eighteenth Century. National Gallery of Art, 2007.
