= Renée-Élisabeth Marlié =

French engraver *1714–1773)

Renée-Élisabeth Marlié (1714 – 27 March 1773, in Paris) was an 18th-century French engraver.

== Biography ==
The daughter of a master writer, Marlié married François-Bernard Lépicié in 1732, an engraver who taught her his art and, according to Pierre-Jean Mariette, used her skill in several of his own works. She signed various prints with her name: Le Contrat de mariage, after Carle (or Charles André) van Loo; la Piémontaise, after Noël Hallé; les Éléments, 4 pieces in-4°, after Étienne Jeaurat; la Jeunesse sous les habillements de la Décrépitude, after Charles Antoine Coypel; a copy of the Bénédicité and la Mère laborieuse by Jean-Siméon Chardin; le Philosophe, le Buveur and le Cuisinier flamand, after David Teniers the Younger; Saint Jean-Baptiste after Raphael and l’Évêque Fléchier after Hyacinthe Rigaud; the portraits of C. Mellan and Fléchier, for the suite by Michel Odieuvre, la Vie champêtre, after François Boucher (1741); l’Amour moissonneur et l’Amour oiseleur by the same artist, Le Déjeuné, a print with the mention: "Engraved etchings by Lépicié" but Louis César de La Baume Le Blanc attributes the work to her. Besides these works previously mentioned, the following engravings are also signed simply Lépicié:

- Caffé charmant ta liqueur agréable
- De Bacchus calme les accès
- Ton feu divin dissipe de la table
- Et les dégoûts et les excès.

== Le Cuisinier Flamand ==
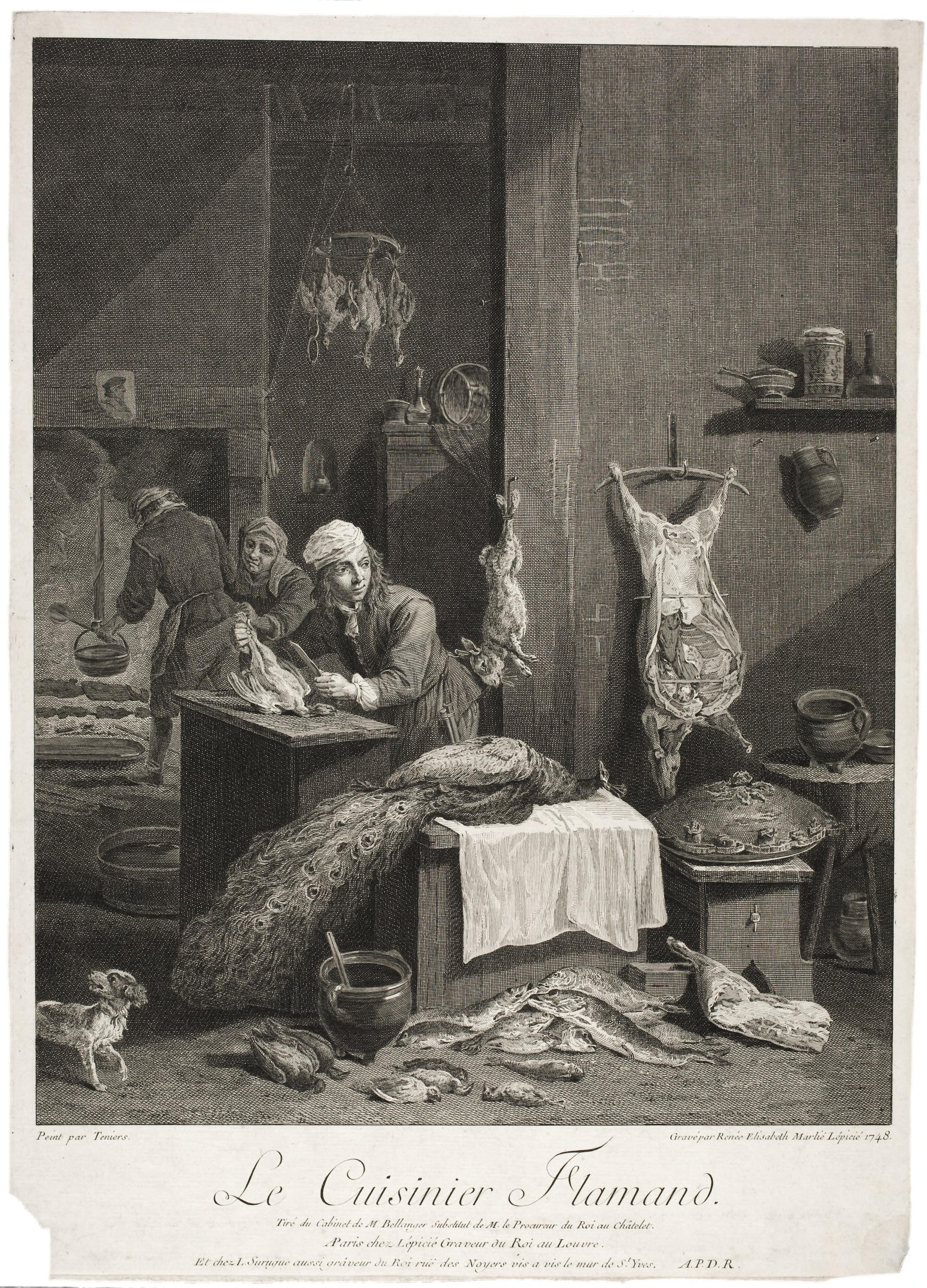
by Renee Elisabeth Marlié Lépicié

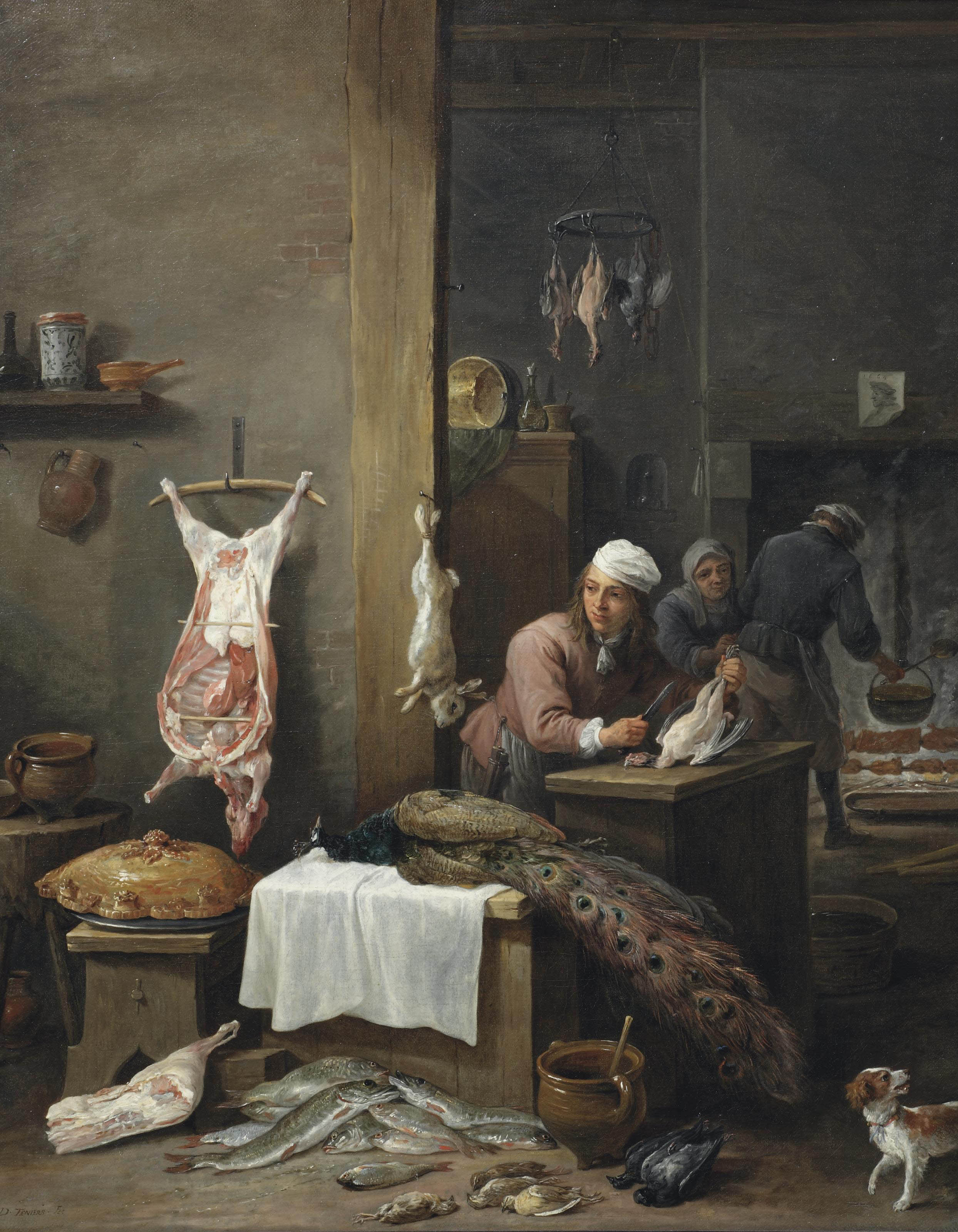
by David Teniers II

She died in the dwelling occupied by her husband in the Louvre, which had been left to her. Her son, the painter Nicolas Bernard Lépicié designed boards for the continuation of l’Histoire de France, which was finished by Jean-Michel Moreau.

== Sources ==
- Abecedario de P.-J. Mariette, et autres notes inédites de cet amateur sur les arts et les artistes, work published by MM. Ph. de Chennevières and A. de Montaiglon, Paris, J.-B. Dumoulin, 1851/53-1859/60.
- Roger Portalis and Henri Beraldi, Les Graveurs du dix-huitième siècle, vol. I, Paris, Morgand et Fatout, 1880–82, (p. 662), OCLC 724078042.
- Michael Bryan and G.C. Williamson, Bryan’s dictionary of painters and engravers, vol.3, Londob, G. Bell and sons, 1904, (p. 212).
