= Nicolas Bernard Lépicié =

French painter (1735–1784)

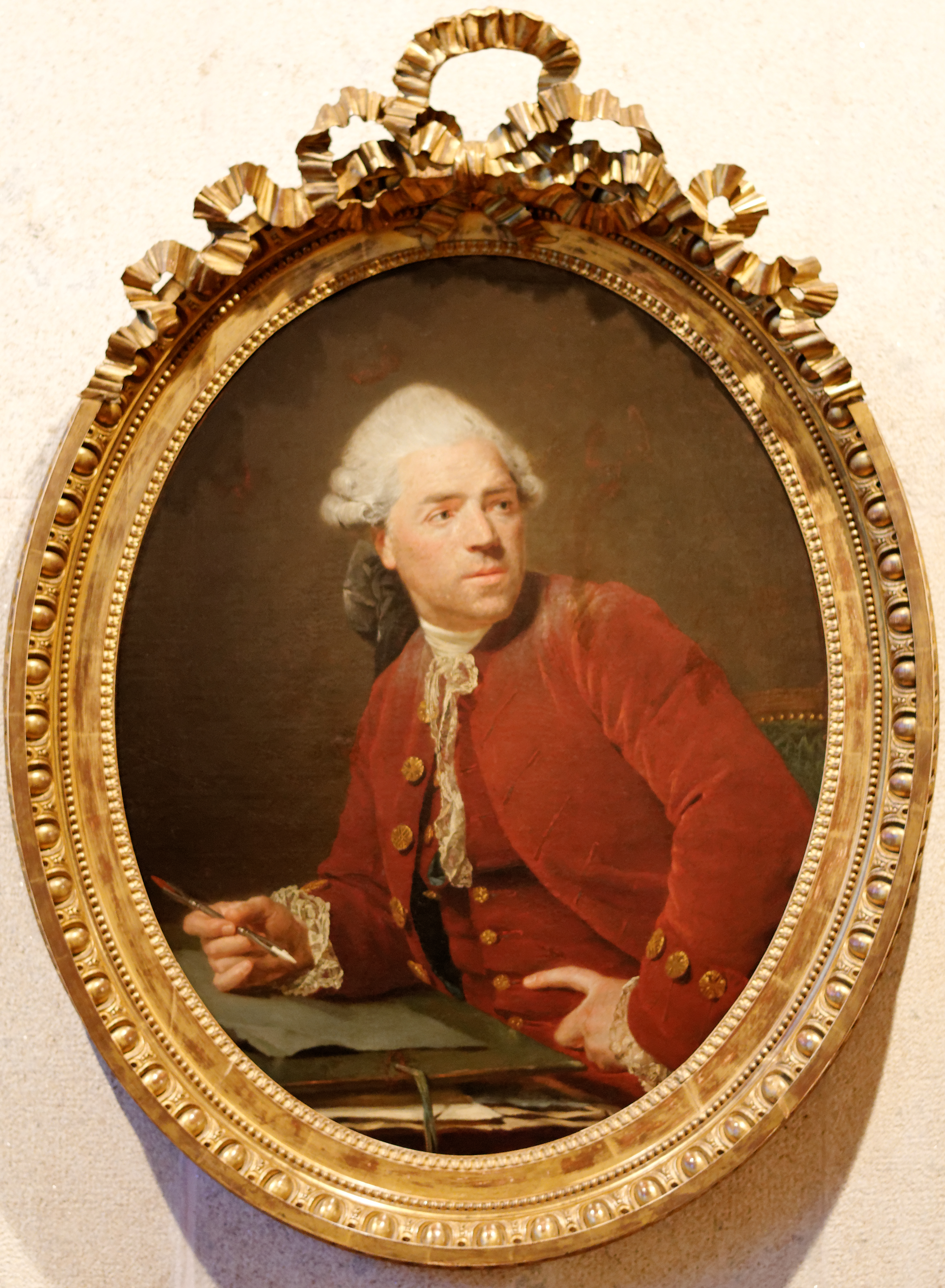
- Nicolas-Bernard Lépicié, selfportrait (c. 1777); Lisbon, Calouste Gulbenkian Museum.
- Born: 16 June 1735; Paris, France
- Died: 15 September 1784 (aged 49); Paris, France
- Occupation: Painter

Nicolas Bernard Lépicié (16 June 1735 – 15 September 1784) was a French painter and teacher of painting, the son of two well-known engravers at the time, François-Bernard Lépicié and Renée-Élisabeth Marlié. Lépicié was famous in his lifetime, and compared to Chardin and Greuze.

== Life ==
Nicolas-Bernard studied with leading artists of the century including Carle Vanloo. In 1769 he was accepted into the Royal Academy of Painting and Sculpture in Paris. Three years later, in 1772, he became an assistant professor and, in 1777, a professor. He taught important names such as Carle Vernet, Jean-Frederic Schall, Jean-Antoine-Théodore Giroust, Jean-Joseph Taillasson, Henri-Pierre Danloux, Jean-Baptiste Regnault and Nicolas-Antoine Taunay.

== Work ==
Lépicié's work was visibly influenced by his father's friend, Jean-Baptiste-Siméon Chardin, whose themes were a source of inspiration. Lépicié's subjects range from portraits (Le Petit Dessinateur -1772; The Astronomer (i.e. Pierre Charles Le Monnier) - 1777) to history paintings (Achilles and the Centaur Chiron - 1769) and genre scenes (A Mother Feeding her Child - 1774, Cour de ferme - 1784).

== Gallery ==
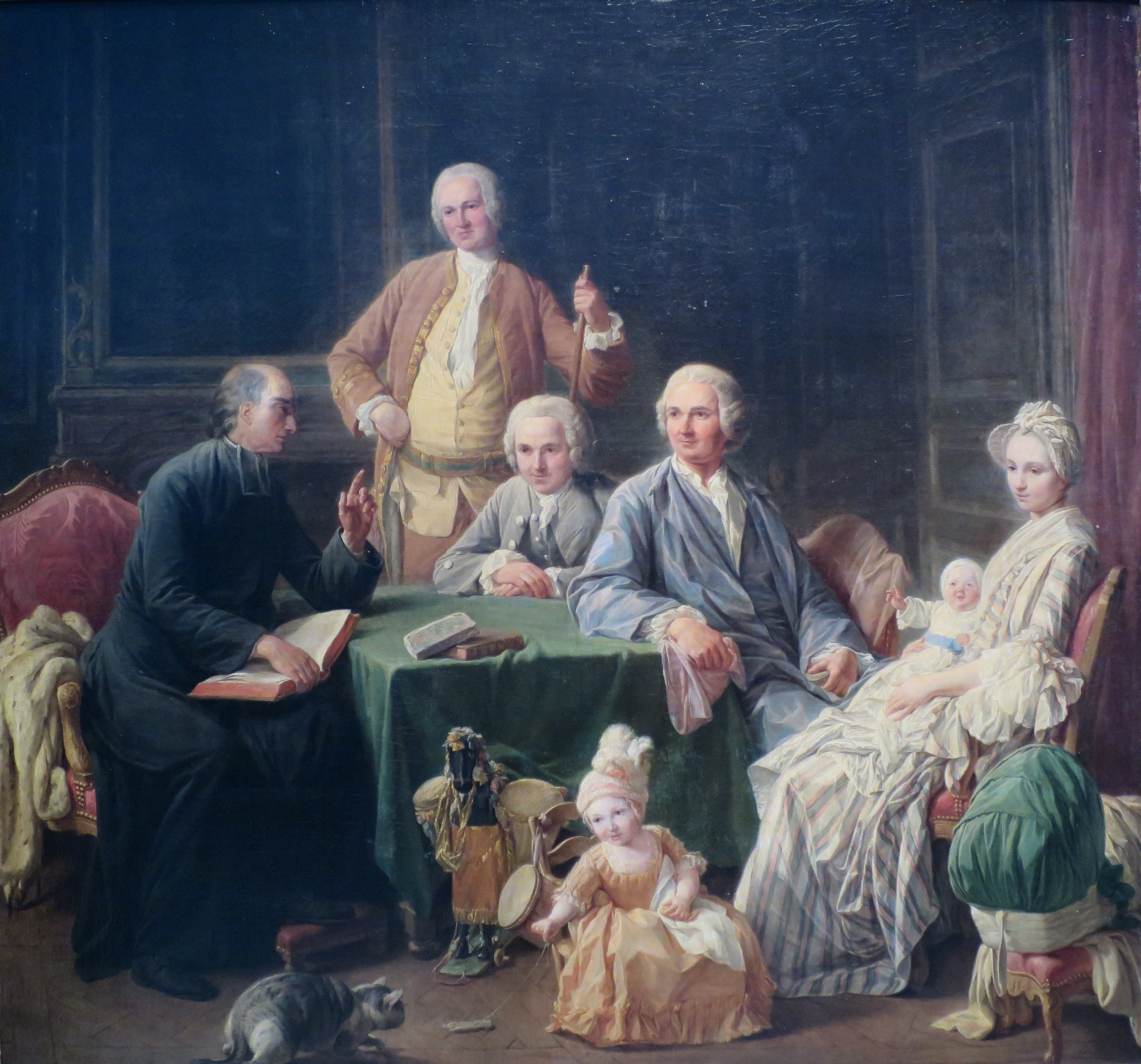
Portrait de la famille Leroy (1766), Moscow, Pushkin Museum.

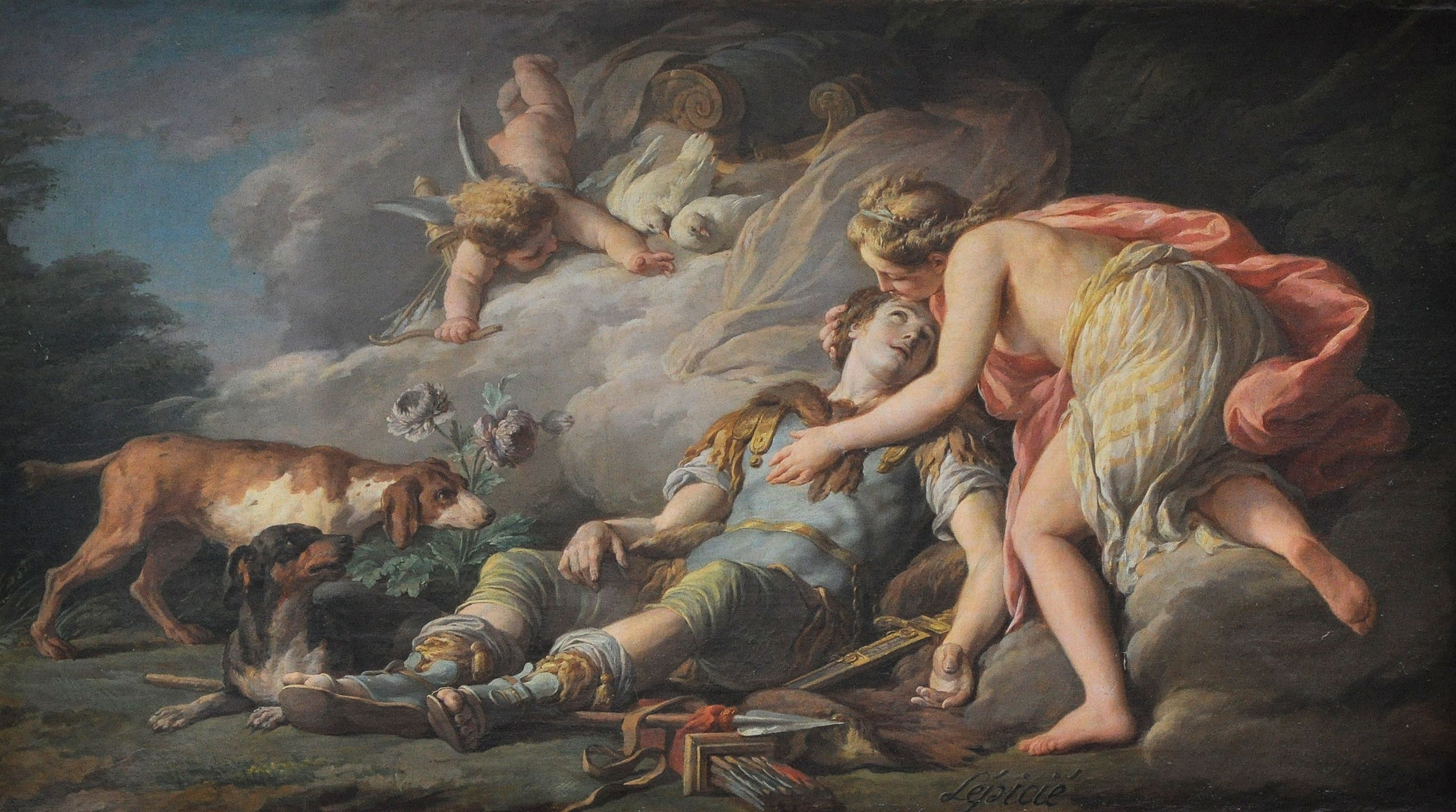
Adonis changé en Anémone (c. 1768), Palace of Versailles.

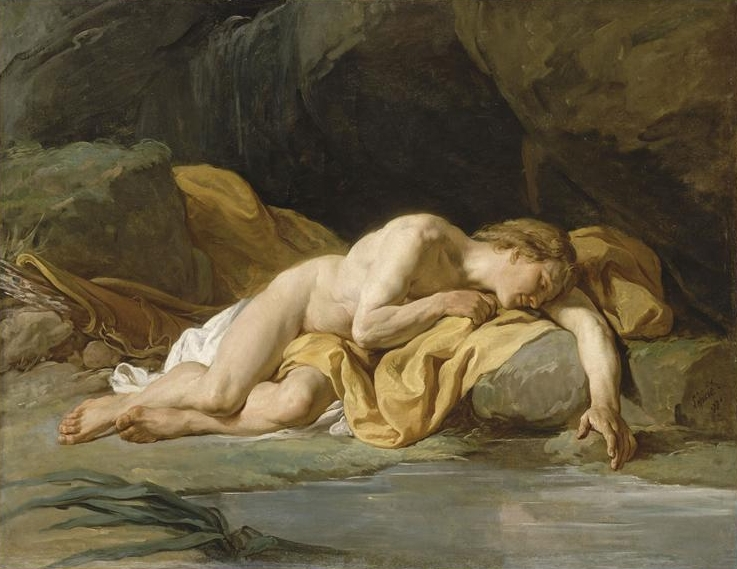
Narcisse (1771), Saint-Quentin, Antoine-Lécuyer Museum.

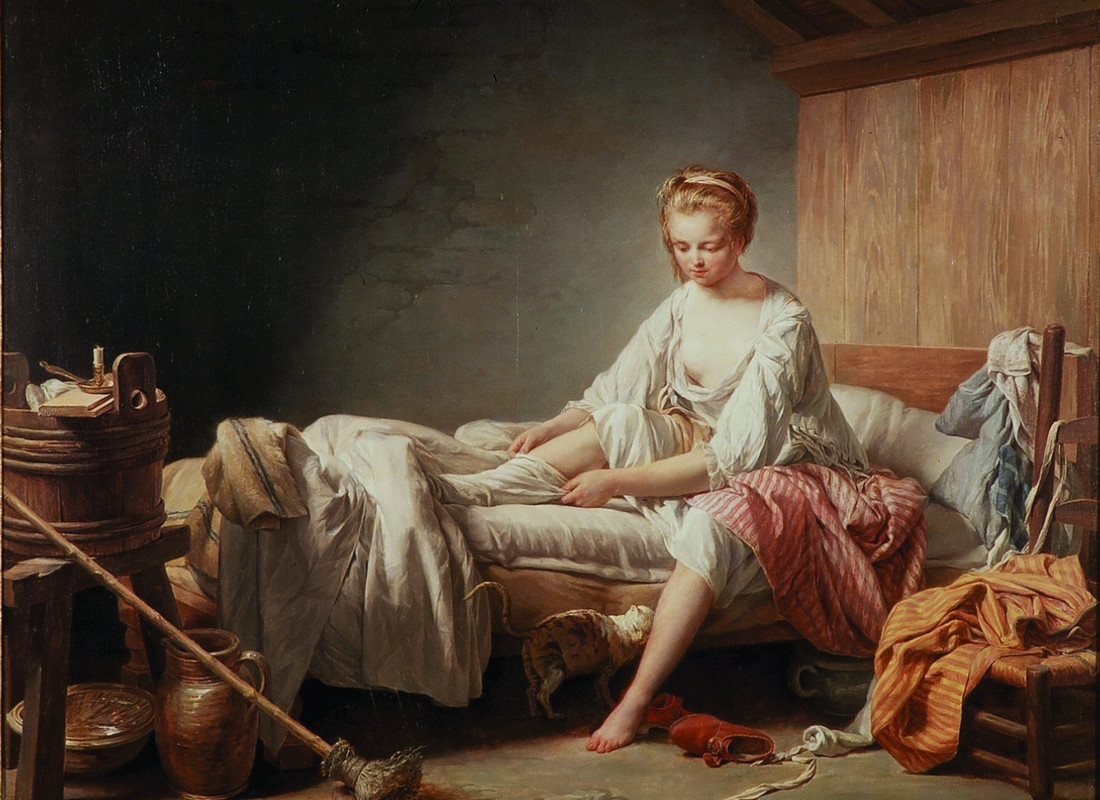
Le Lever de Fanchon (1773), Saint-Omer, musée de l'hôtel Sandelin.

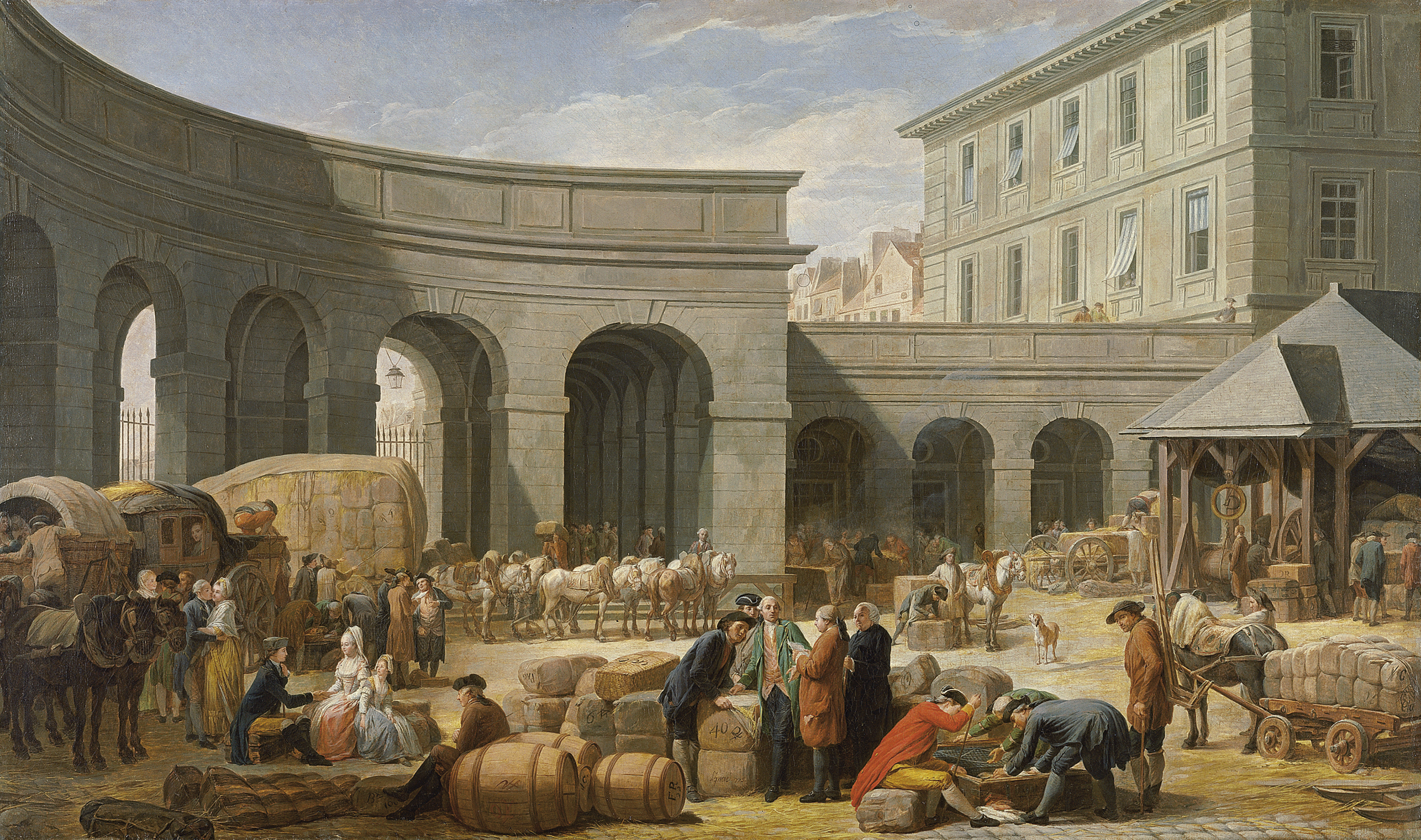
The Interior of a Customs House (1775), Madrid, Thyssen-Bornemisza Museum.

The Interior of a Market (1779), Private collection

The Departure of the Poacher (1781)

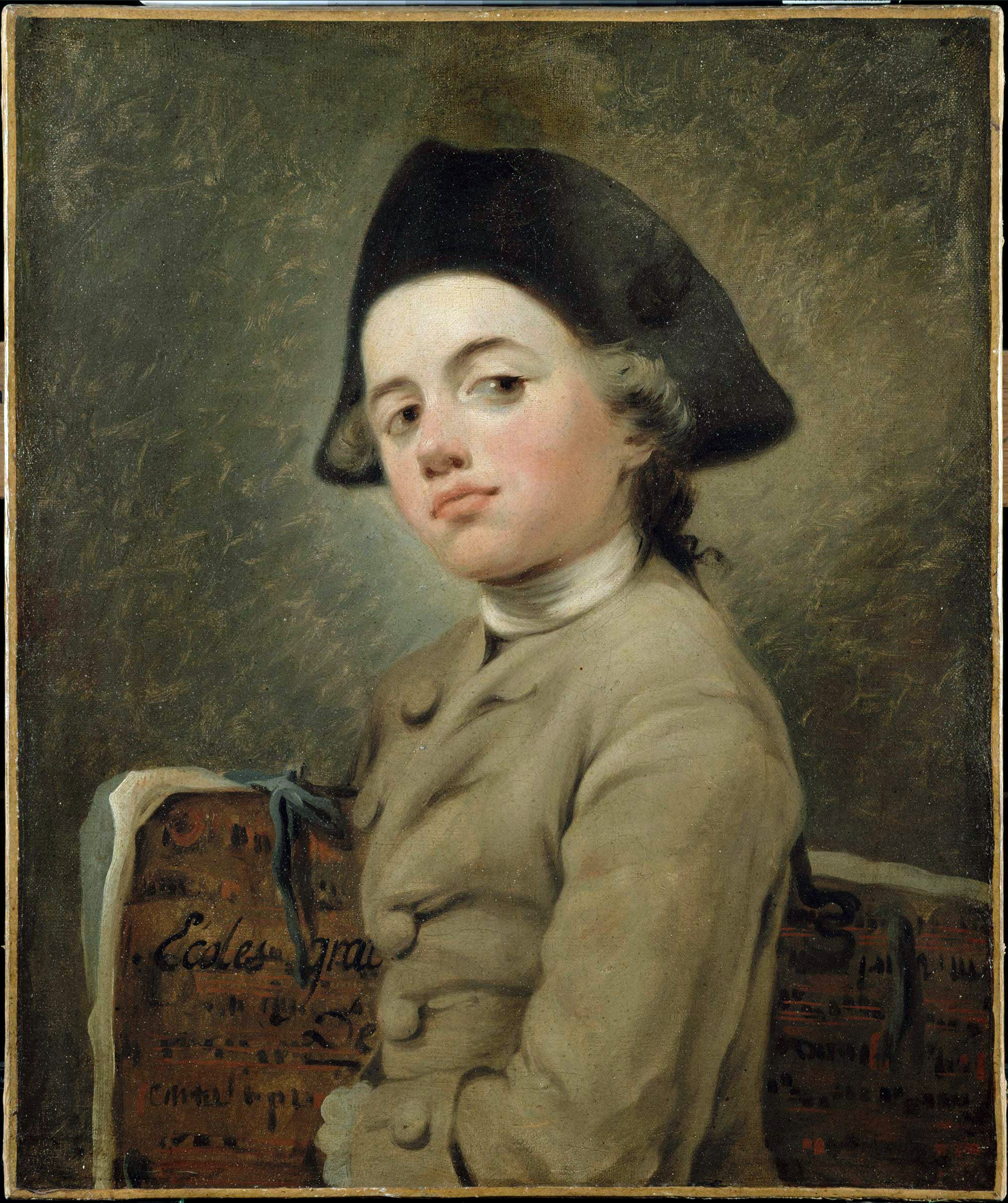
Le Jeune Dessinateur, Paris, musée du Louvre displayed at the Musée national des beaux-arts du Québec in 2008

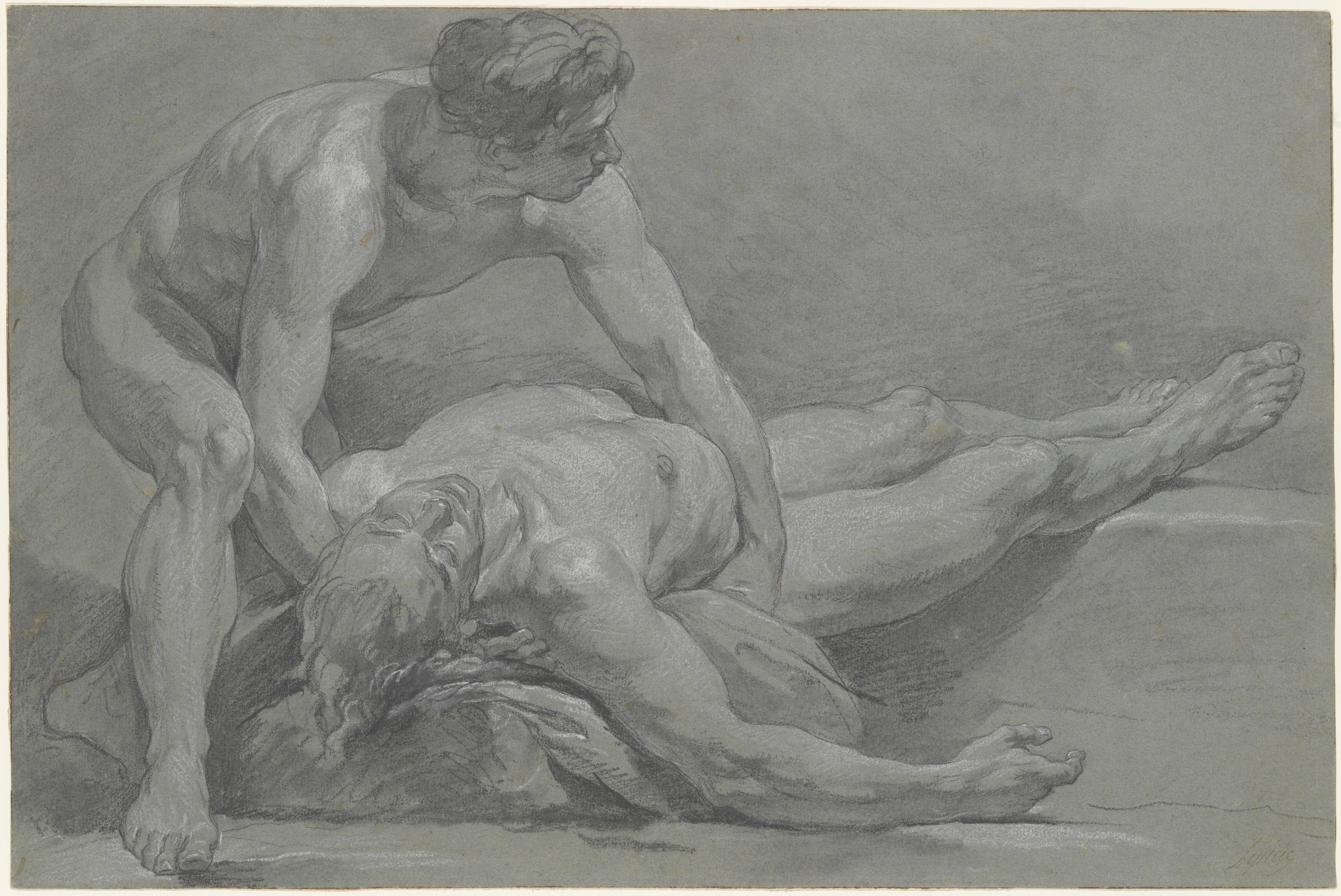
Two Nude Male Figures at the Metropolitan Museum of Art

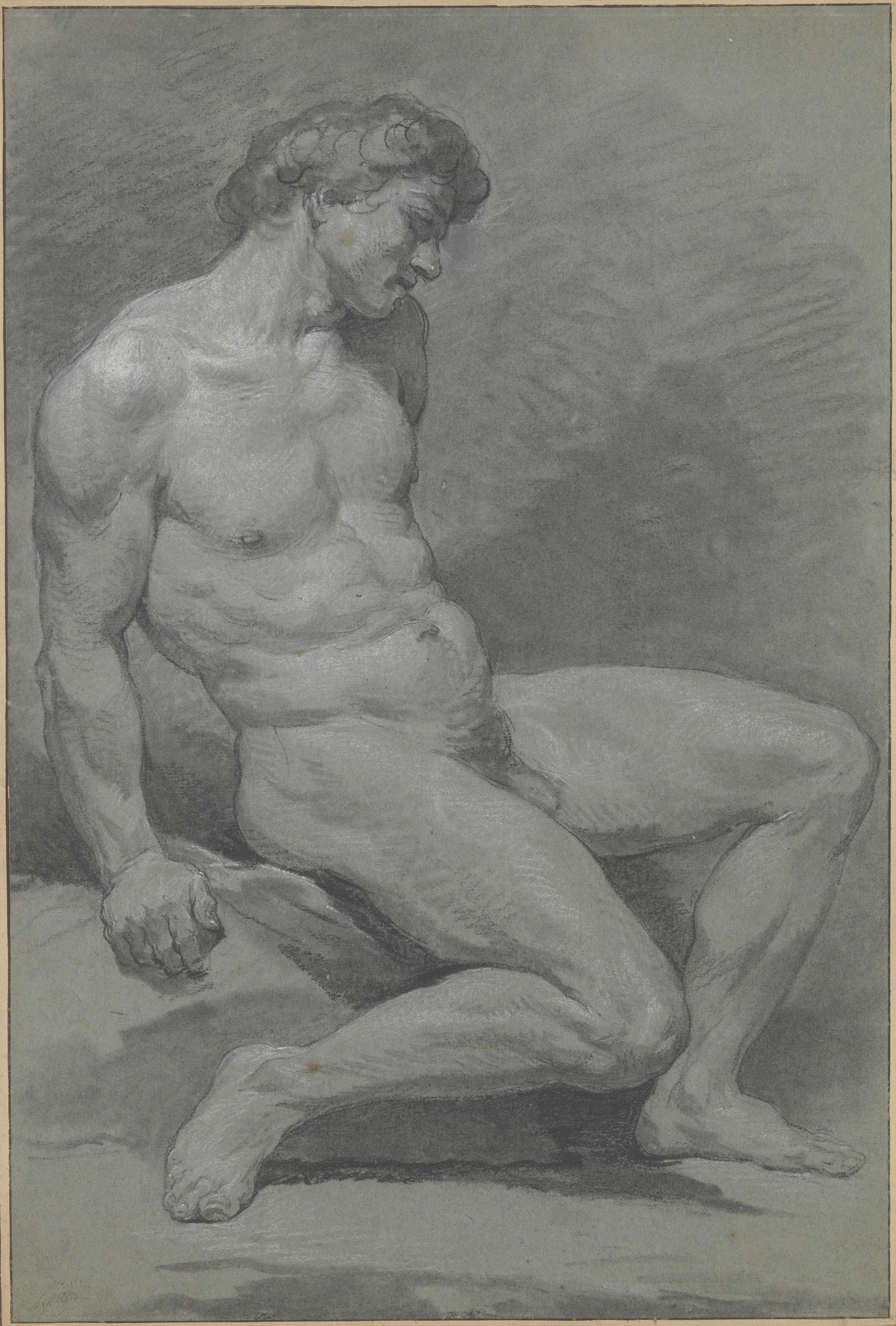
Seated Male Nude Facing Right at the Metropolitan Museum of Art
