= Virgil Reading the Aeneid to Augustus and Octavia (Taillasson) =

Painting by Jean-Joseph Taillasson

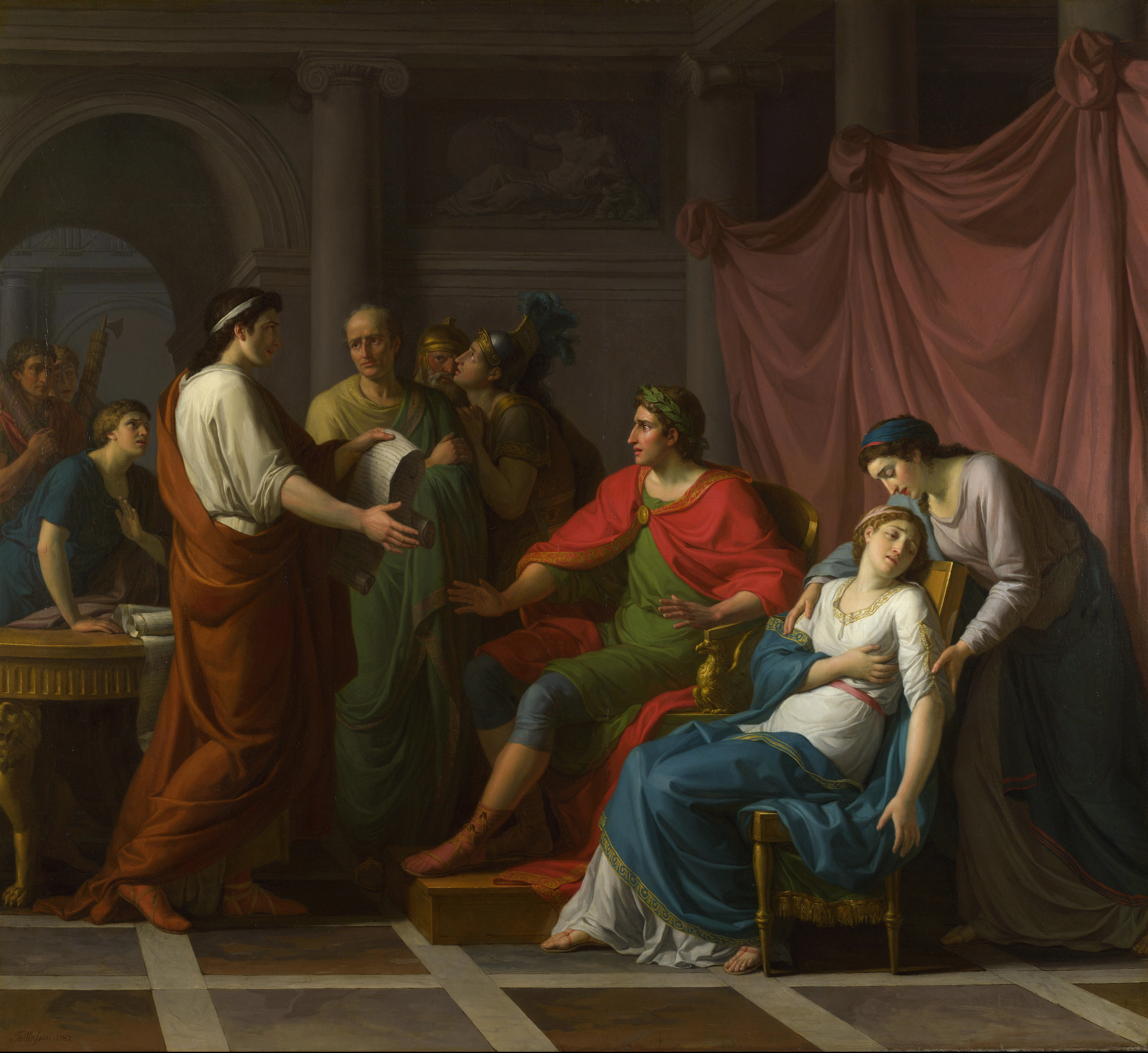
- Artist: Jean-Joseph Taillasson
- Year: 1787
- Type: Oil on canvas, history painting
- Dimensions: 146.2 cm × 166.9 cm (57.6 in × 65.7 in)
- Location: National Gallery; London

Virgil Reading the Aeneid to Augustus and Octavia is a 1787 history painting by the French artist Jean-Joseph Taillasson. Neoclassical in style it depicts a scene set in Ancient Rome. The poet Virgil is reading from his epic work the Aeneid to the first emperor Augustus and his sister Octavia. The poem relates the mythical origins of Rome, based on survivors from the Siege of Troy. A passage featuring Aeneas encountering Octavia's son Marcellus, who had recently died, caused her to faint.

The painting was exhibited at the Salon of 1787 held at the Louvre in Paris. The picture is now in the National Gallery in London, which purchased it in 1974.

The following year the Swiss artist Angelica Kauffman produced her own painting Virgil Reading the Aeneid to Augustus and Octavia based on the subject.

== Bibliography ==
- Frankel, Benjamin (ed.) History in Dispute: Classical Antiquity and Classical Studies. St. James Press, 2000.
- Horejsi, Nicole. Novel Cleopatras: Romance Historiography and the Dido Tradition in English Fiction, 1688–1785. University of Toronto Press, 2019.
- Woolf, Greg (ed.) The Cambridge Illustrated History of the Roman World. Cambridge University Press, 2003.
