= François-Bernard Lépicié =

French engraver, historiographer and biographer (1698–1755)

- Born: 6 October 1698; Paris
- Died: 17 January 1755 (aged 56); Paris
- Education: Jean Mariette; Gaspard Duchange
- Known for: printmaking; historiography
- Spouse: Renée-Élisabeth Marlié

François-Bernard Lépicié (6 October 1698 – 17 January 1755) was an 18th-century French engraver, historiographer and biographer.

Lépicié married Renée-Élisabeth Marlié, who became an engraver under the training of her husband and with whom he had a son, the painter Nicolas-Bernard Lépicié. He died from a stroke.

== Gallery ==
Selected prints by François-Bernard Lépicié
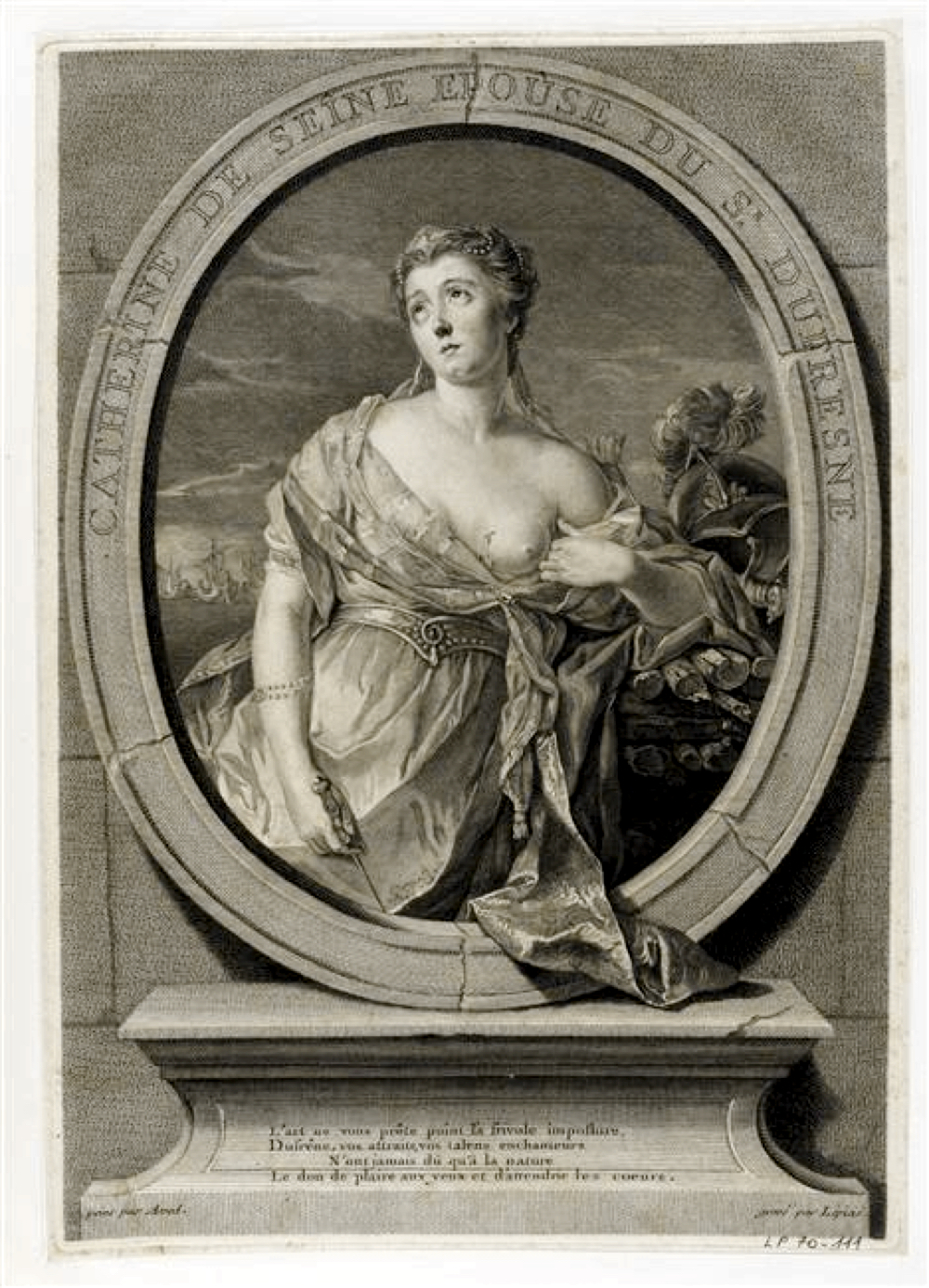
Madame Quinault-Dufresne, after Joseph Aved, 1726

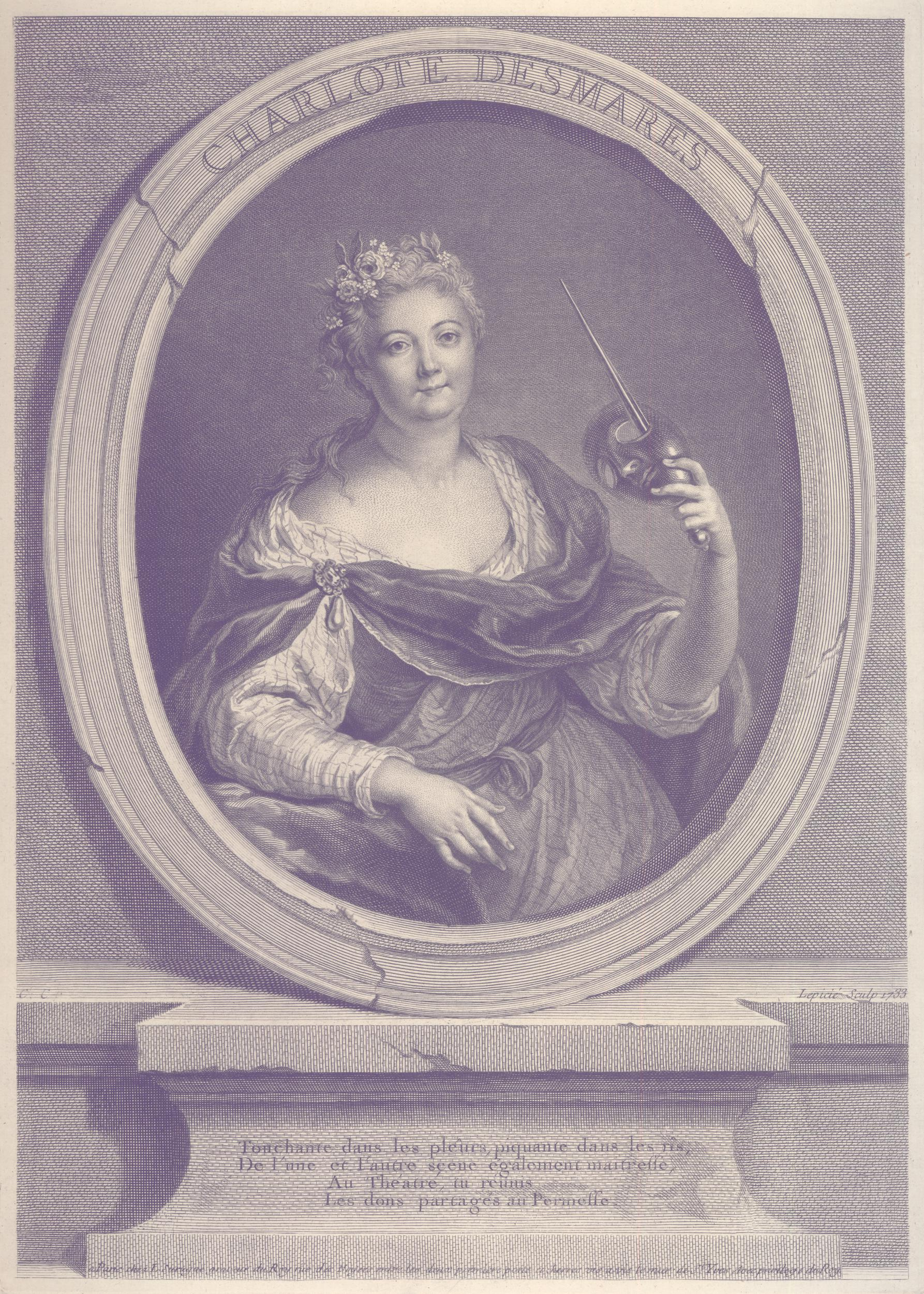
Charlotte Desmares, after Charles-Antoine Coypel, 1733

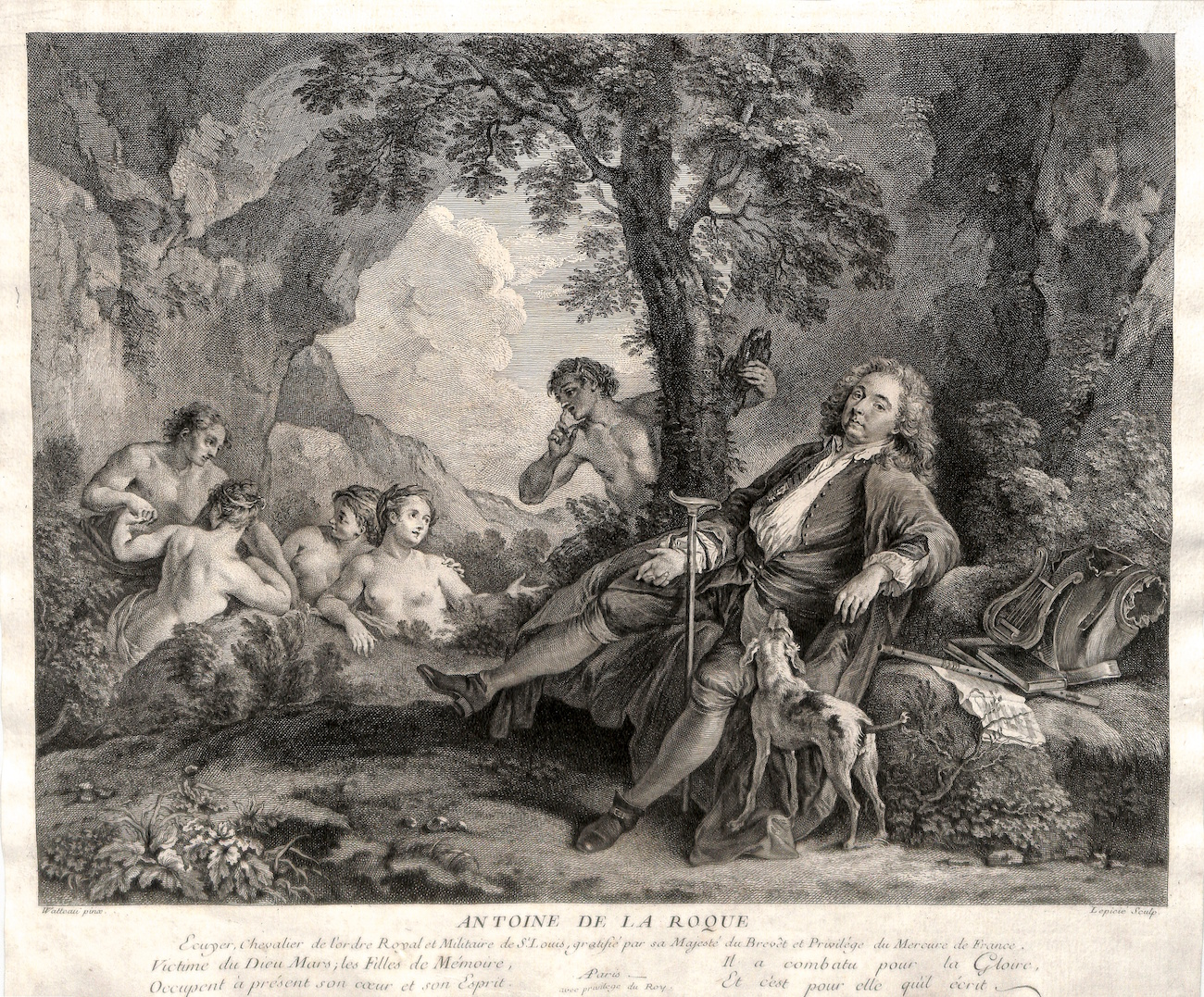
Antoine de Laroque, after Antoine Watteau, c. 1734

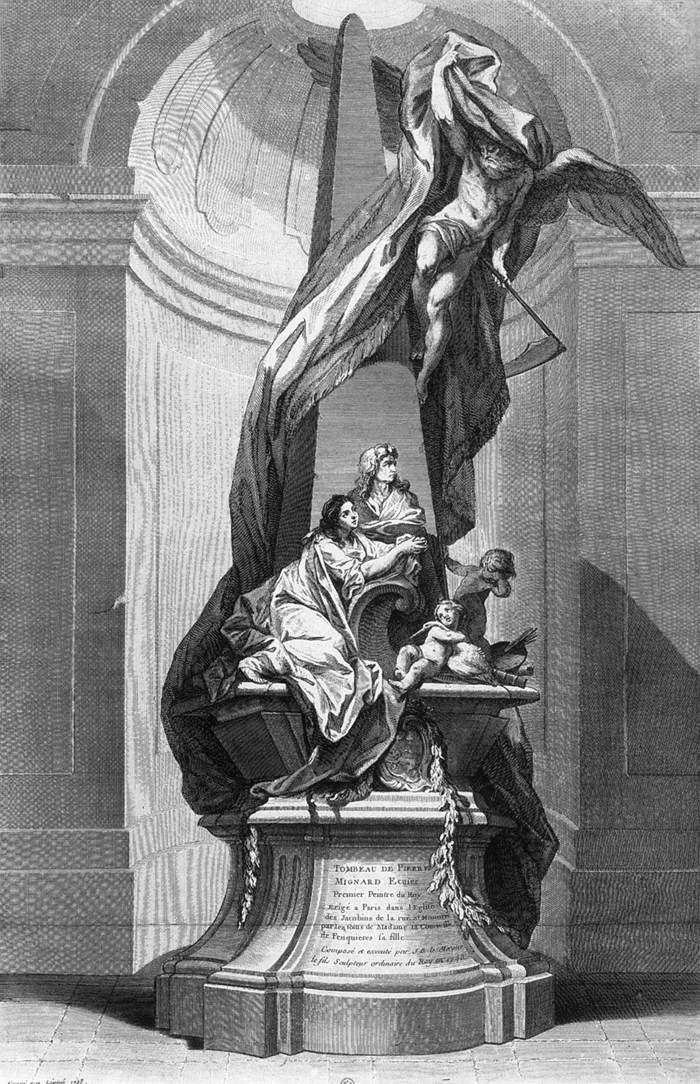
Monument to Pierre Mignard, 1743

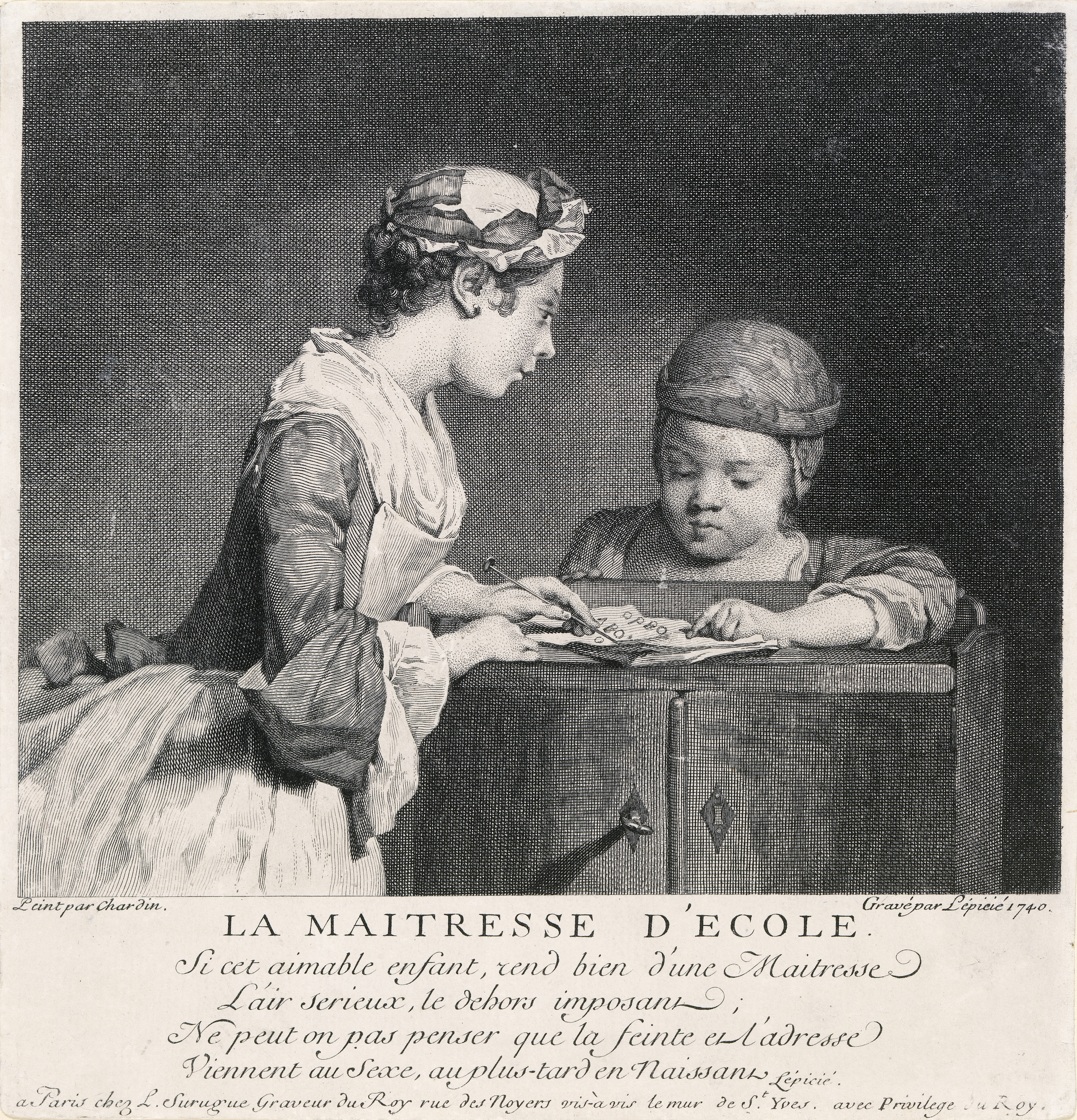
La Maîtresse d'École, after Jean-Baptiste-Siméon Chardin

== Sources ==
- Philippe Le Bas Dictionnaire encyclopédique de la France, vol.10, Paris, Firmin Didot frères, 1843, (p. 180).
- Louis-Gabriel Michaud, Biographie universelle, ancienne et moderne ou histoire, vol.24, Paris, Mme Desplaces, 1854, (p. 250).
