= Jean-Joseph Taillasson =

French painter (1745–1809)

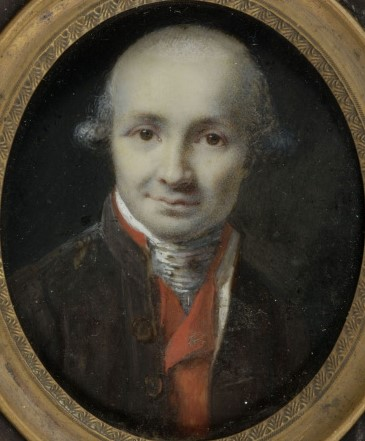
Self-portrait

Jean-Joseph Taillasson (French: [ʒɑ̃ ʒozɛf tɑjasɔ̃]; 6 July 1745 – 11 November 1809) was a French history painter, portraitist, draftsman, and art critic.

== Biography ==
Taillasson was born at Blaye, near Bordeaux. His poem Le Danger des règles dans les Arts was noted with approval by the Danish visitor to Paris, Tønnes Christian Bruun-Neergaard, and an elegy Sur la Nuit, he thought, seemed fit to soften the least sensitive heart. He matured his talent in the Paris ateliers of Joseph-Marie Vien (from 1764) and Nicolas Bernard Lépicié and, having won third place in the Prix de Rome competition, 1769, spent four years, 1773–77, in Italy. At his return to Paris he set an early example of neoclassicism.

His Observations sur quelques grands peintres offered anti-academic advice somewhat at variance with his own manner; some of the collected observations had previously appeared in the Journal des Arts. He died in Paris.

== Selected works ==
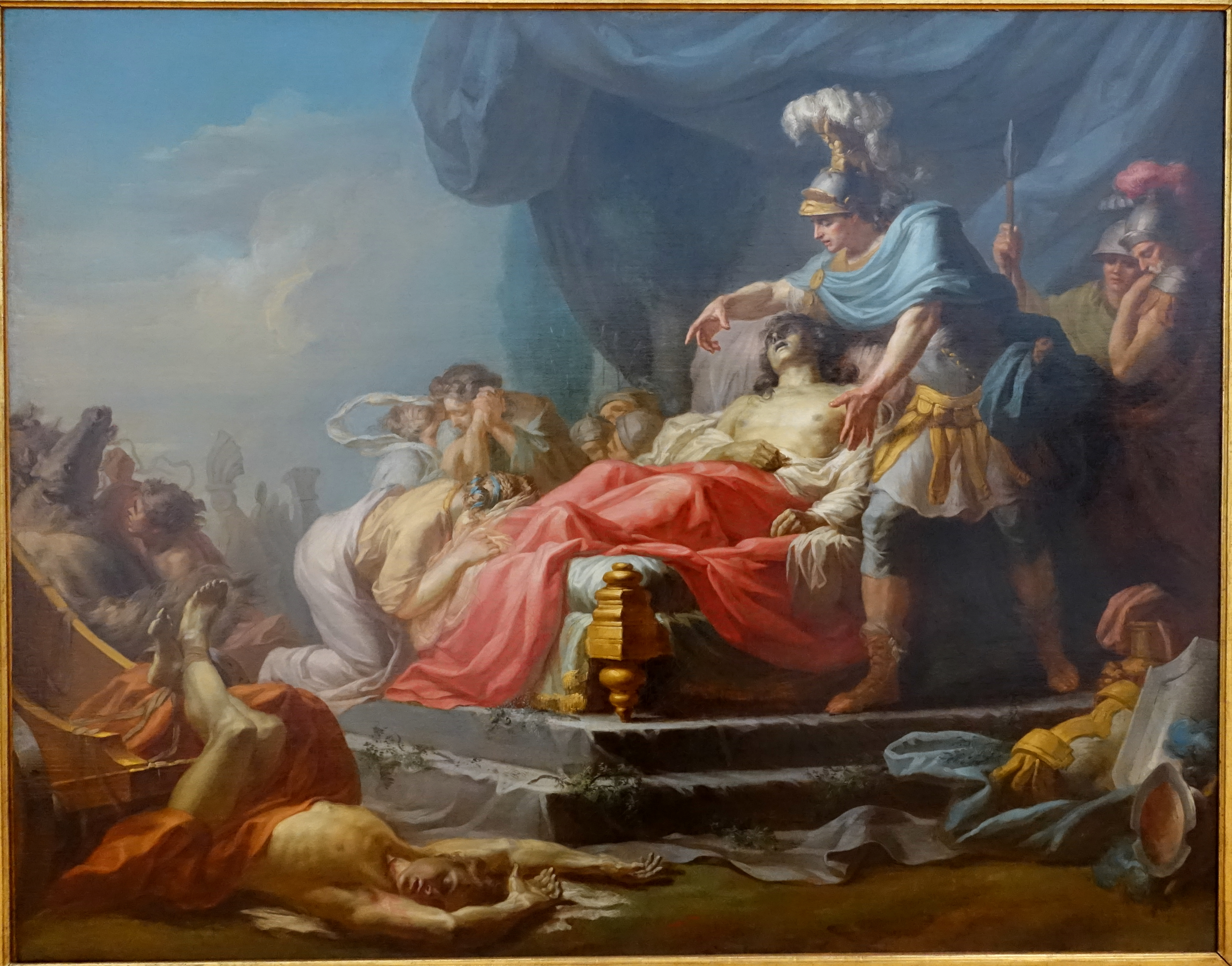
Achilles Displaying the Body of Hector at the Feet of Patroclus (1769)

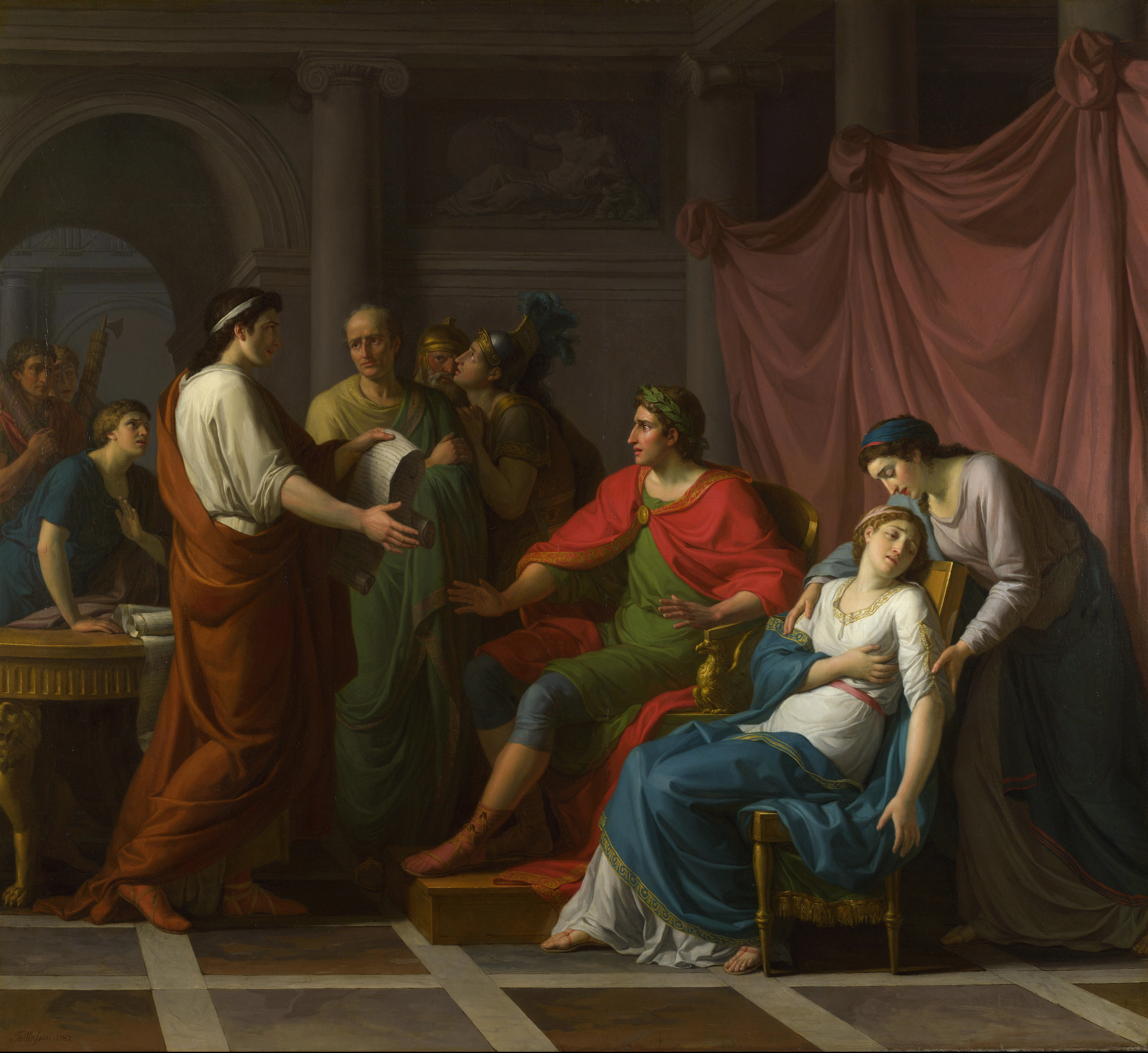
Virgil Reading the Aeneid to Augustus and Octavia (1787)

- Self Portrait, Musée du Louvre
- Jeune Homme, vêtu d'une robe, levant les bras, Musée du Louvre
- La Nymphe surprise, Musée des Augustins, Toulouse
- Timoléon à qui les Syracusiens amènent des étrangers, Musée Ingres, Montauban; another version is at the Musée des Beaux-Arts, Tours.
- Un Vieillard, assis, lisant, Musée du Louvre
- Vieillard drapé, debout, vu de dos, Musée du Louvre.
- Claude-Louis, comte de Saint-Germain (1707-1778), 1777 Musée national de Versailles
- La Naissance de Louis XIII, 1782 Musée des Beaux-Arts, Pau
- La Madeleine au désert, 1784 Montreal Museum of Fine Arts
- Ulysse et Néoptolème enlevant à Philoctète les flèches d'Hercule, 1784 Musée des Beaux-Arts, Bordeaux; this was his morceau de reception at the Académie royale de peinture et de sculpture.
- Sabinus et Eponina découverts par les soldats de Vespasien 1787
- Virgil Reading the Aeneid to Augustus and Octavia, 1787 (National Gallery, London)
- Léandre et Héro, 1789 Musée des Beaux-Arts, Bordeaux
- "Seigneur! Voyez ces yeux" (Cleopatra of Syria is discovered by Rodogune to have poisoned the nuptial cup, a scene from Pierre Corneille's Rodogune (1644), 1791 Boston Museum of Fine Arts; Tønnes Christian Bruun-Neergaard considered that it had established the painter's reputation, and remarked that it had belonged to Citoyen Godefroy, a well-known amateur, who auction dsaletranspired in 1794.
- Pauline, femme de Sénèque, rappelée à la vie, 1791 Musée du Louvre
- Olympias, 1799
- Andromache, 1800
- Rhadamate et Zénobie, 1806
- Spring (or Flora) leading Cupid back to Nature (Bowes Museum, County Durham, UK)
