= Jean-Antoine-Théodore Giroust =

French neoclassical painter (1753–1817)

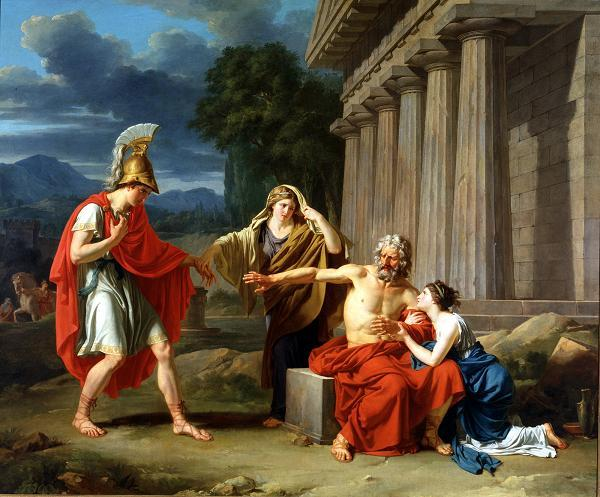
Oedipus at Colonus, 1788, Dallas Museum of Art

Jean-Antoine-Théodore Giroust (French pronunciation: [ʒɑ̃ ɑ̃twan teɔdɔʁ ʒiʁust]; 1753–1817) was a French neoclassical painter.

In 1770, at age seventeen, Giroust started studying painting in the studio of Joseph-Marie Vien, a pioneer of Neoclassicism. Among other students was Jacques-Louis David. In 1775, Vien left Paris as he became director of the French Academy in Rome, and took David with him. Giroust thus decided to move to study with Nicolas Bernard Lépicié.

In 1778, after being awarded the Prix de Rome with the painting The Indignation of David, Giroust left for Rome where he once again joined Vien. Once back in France, Giroust was elected at the Academy, on 29 March 1788, with the painting Oedipus at Colonus, a work of pure Neoclassicism. The choice of a blind hero was surely informed by David's 1780 Blind Belisarius.

Giroust's career was however brought to an end by the French Revolution. He didn't champion the new regime, and eventually retired to the countryside and hardly painted anymore. Giroust died in 1817.

== Works of Art ==
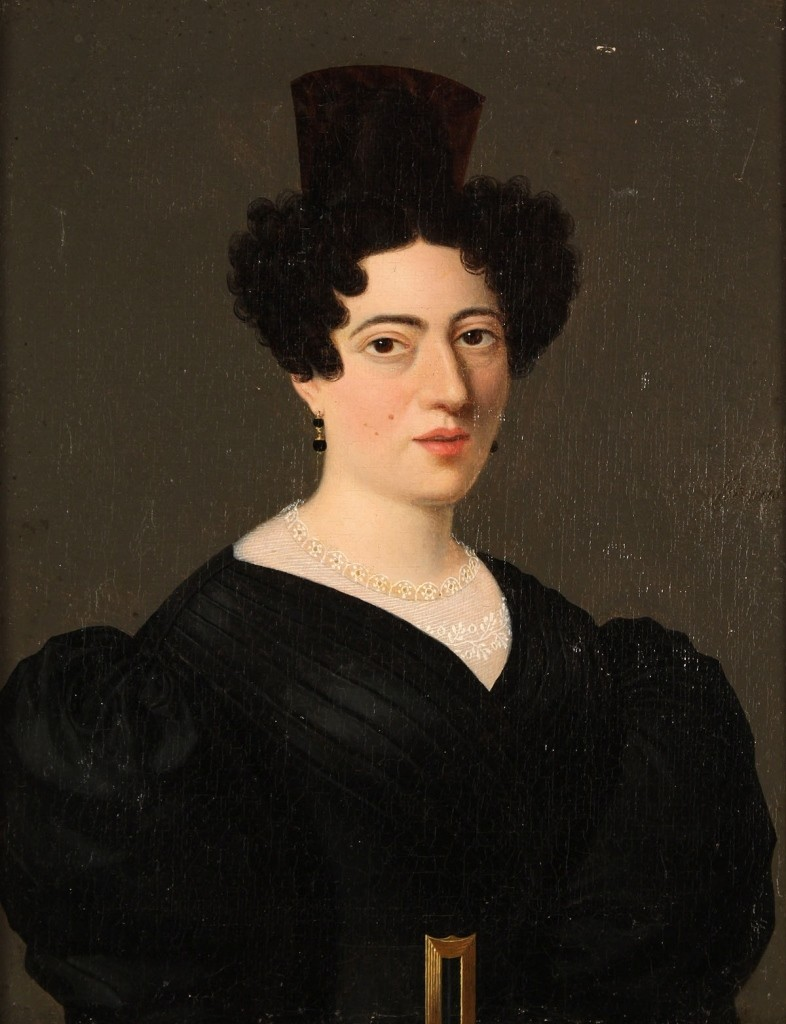
Portrait of a Lady

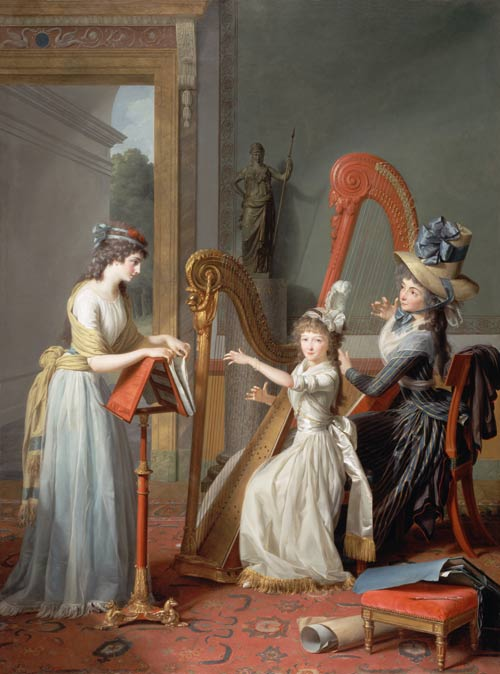
The Harp Players

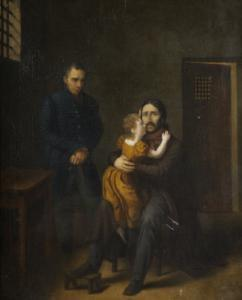
Prisoner And Child

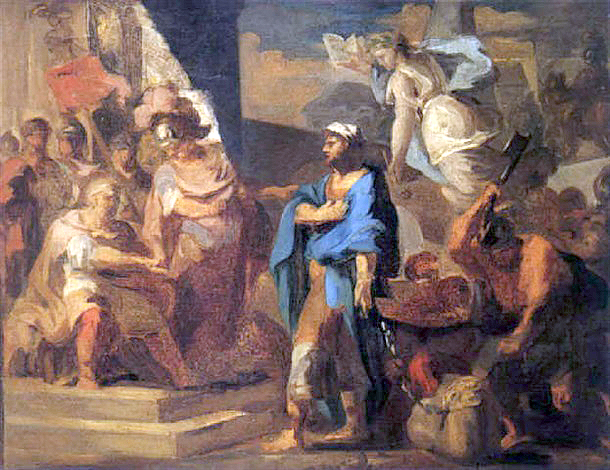
L'historien Juif Flavius Josèphe Délivré À Rome De Ses Fers
