= Putto =

Chubby male child depicted in art

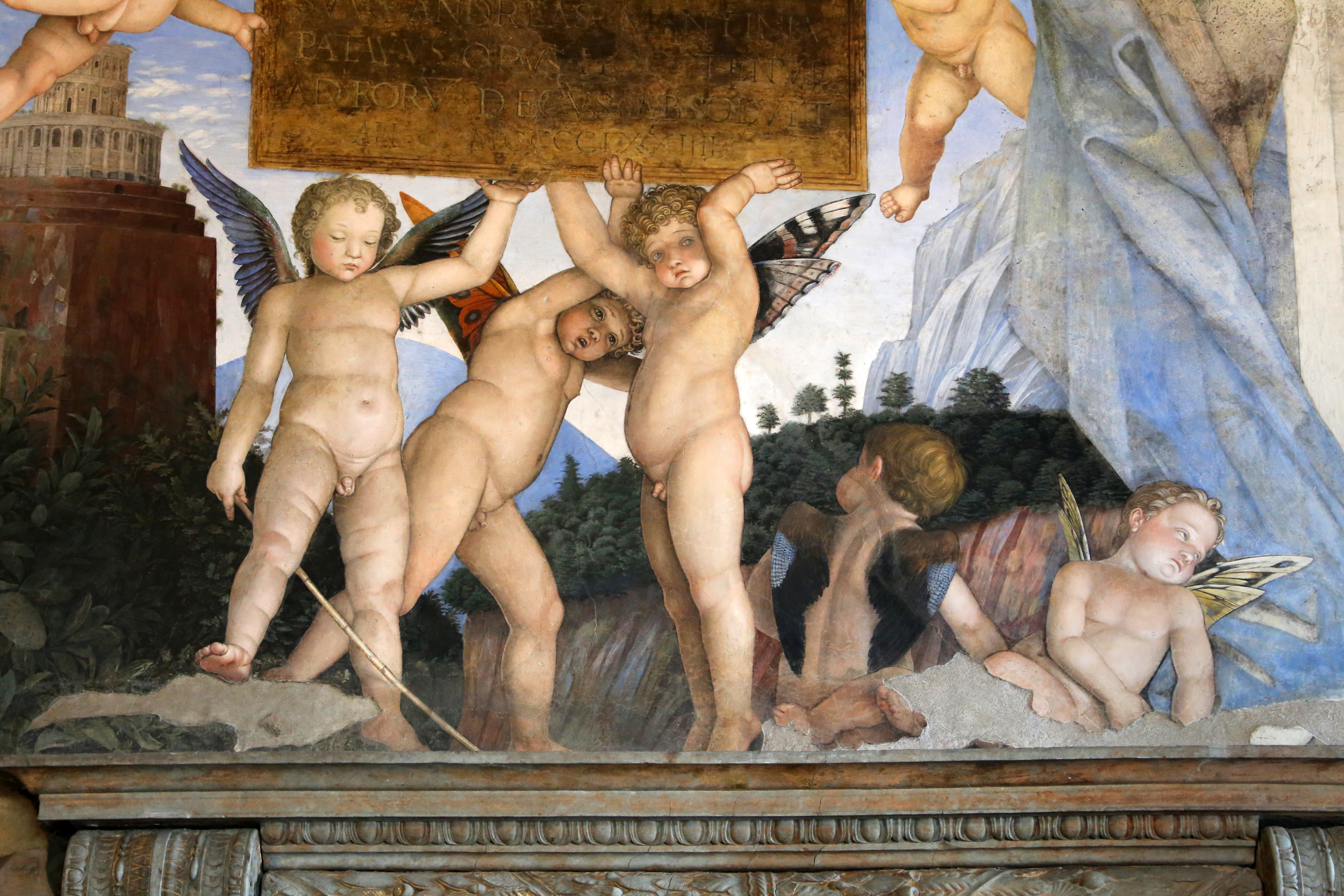
Renaissance putti, detail from the Camera degli Sposi, by Andrea Mantegna, 1465–1474, fresco, Ducal Palace, Mantua, Italy

A putto (Italian: [ˈputto]; plural putti [ˈputti]) is a figure in a work of art depicted as a chubby male child, usually naked and very often winged. Originally limited to profane passions in symbolism, the putto came to represent a sort of baby angel in religious art, often called a cherub (plural cherubs), though in traditional Christian theology, a cherub (plural cherubim) is actually one of the most senior types of angel.

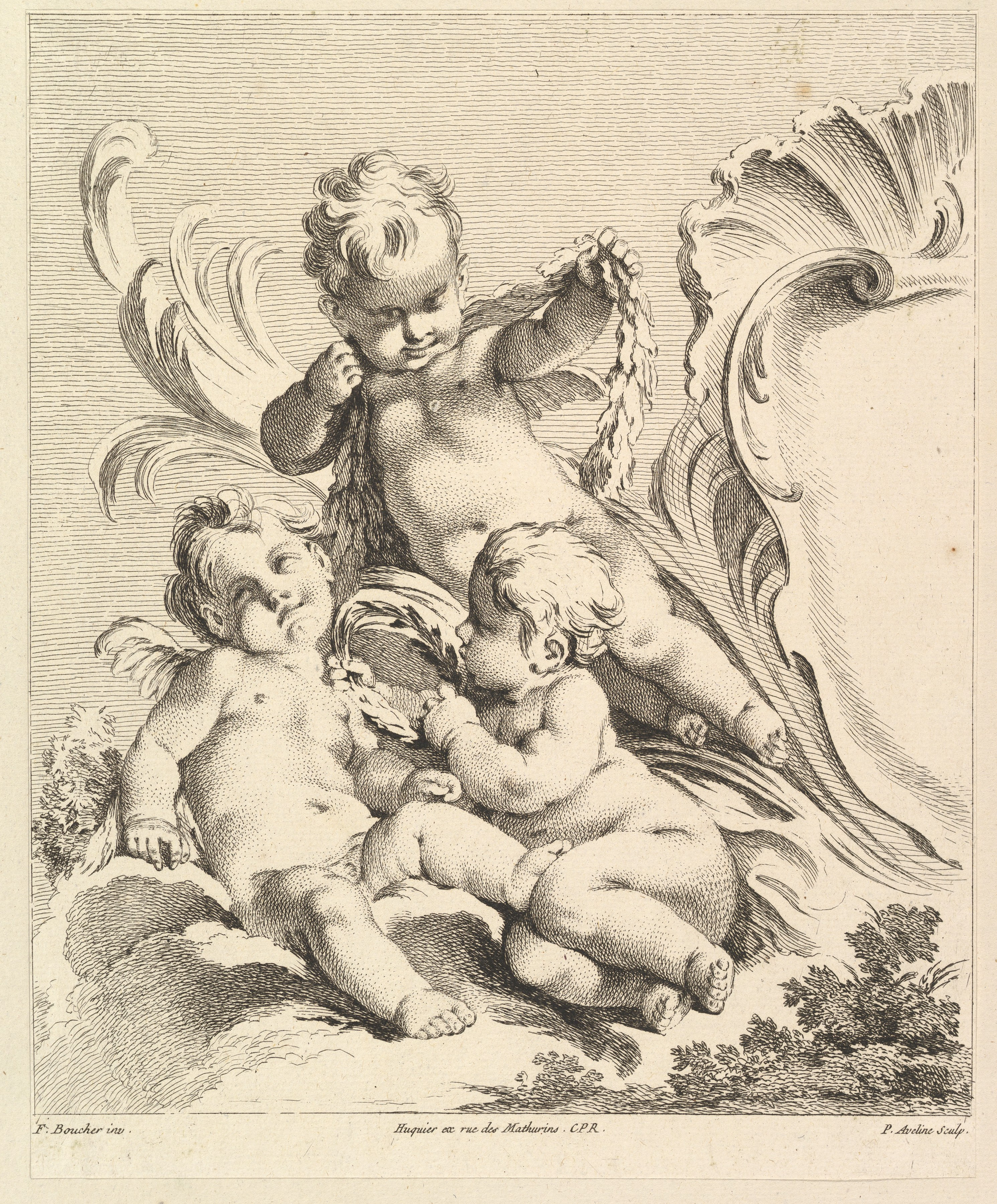
Three Putti Next to a Cartouche, after François Boucher, 1727–1760, etching and engraving, 26.5 × 21.5 cm, Metropolitan Museum of Art, New York City

The same figures were also seen in representations of classical myth, and increasingly in general decorative art. In Baroque art the putto came to represent the omnipresence of God. A putto representing a cupid is also called an amorino (plural amorini) or amoretto (plural amoretti).

== Etymology ==
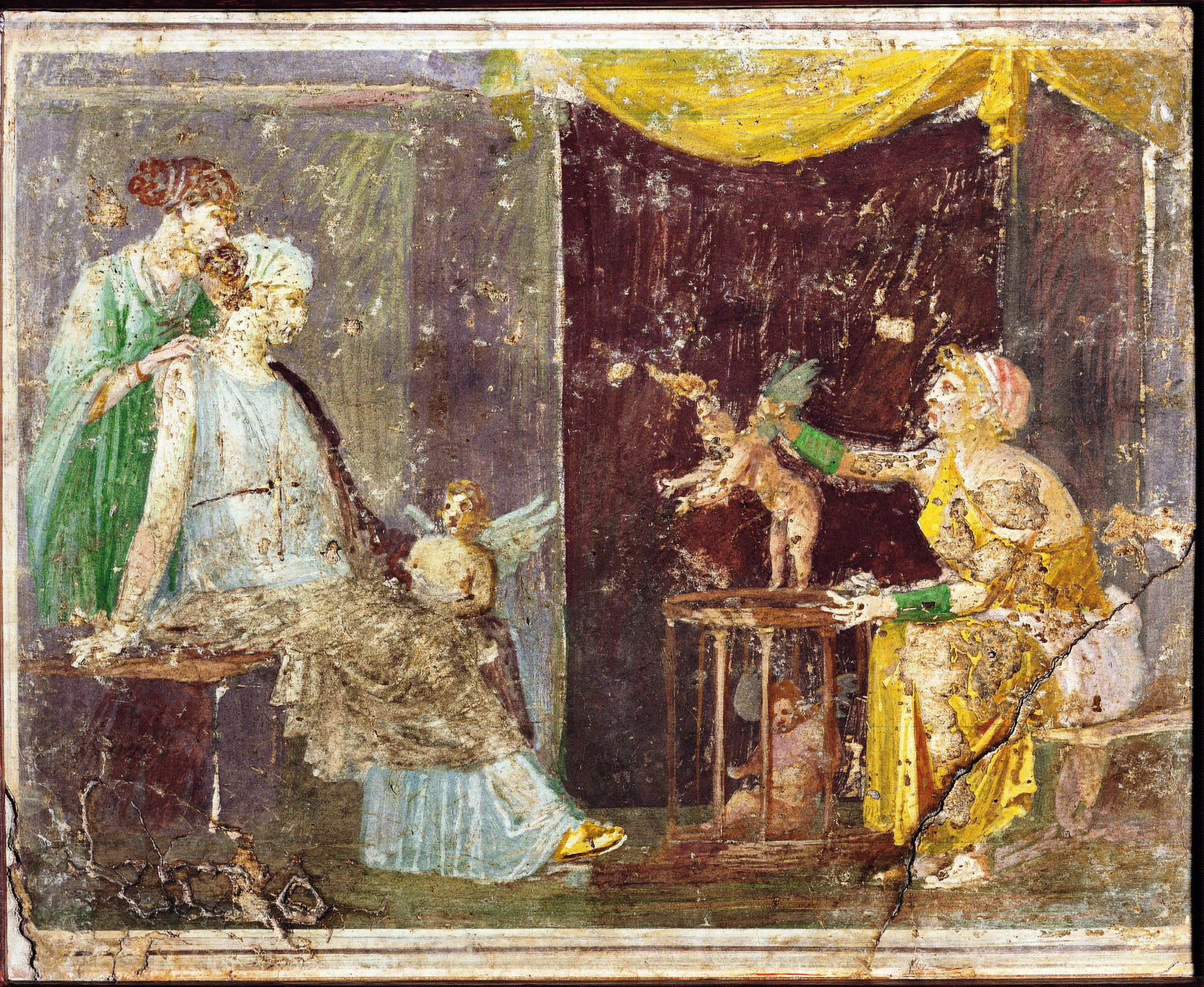
Roman putti in The Cupid Seller, National Archaeological Museum

The more commonly found form putti is the plural of the Italian word putto. The Italian word comes from the Latin word putus, meaning "boy" or "child". Today, in Italian, putto means either toddler winged angel or, rarely, toddler boy. It may have been derived from the same Indo-European root as the Sanskrit word putra (meaning "boy child", as opposed to "son"), Avestan puθra-, Old Persian puça-, Pahlavi (Middle Persian) pus and pusar, all meaning "son", and the New Persian pesar "boy, son".

== History ==
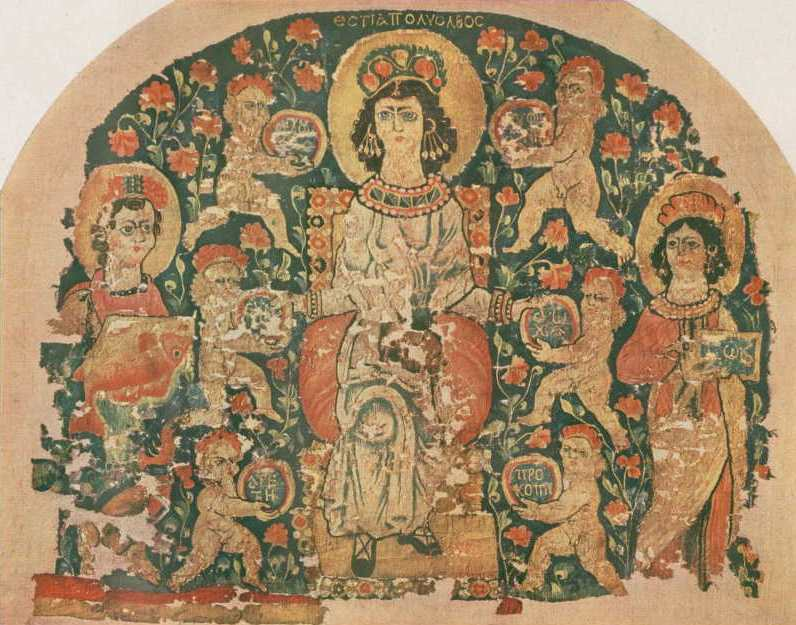
Six Byzantine putti attending to the goddess Hestia, on the Hestia Tapestry, 6th century, tapestry, Dumbarton Oaks, Washington, D.C.

Putti, in the ancient classical world of art, were winged infants that were believed to influence human lives. In Renaissance art, the form of the putto was derived in various ways including the Greek Eros or Roman Cupid (also called "Amor"), the god of love and companion of Aphrodite or Venus, respectively; the Roman genius, a type of guardian spirit; or sometimes the Greek daimon, a type of messenger spirit, being halfway between the realms of the human and the divine.

=== Revival of the putto in the Renaissance ===
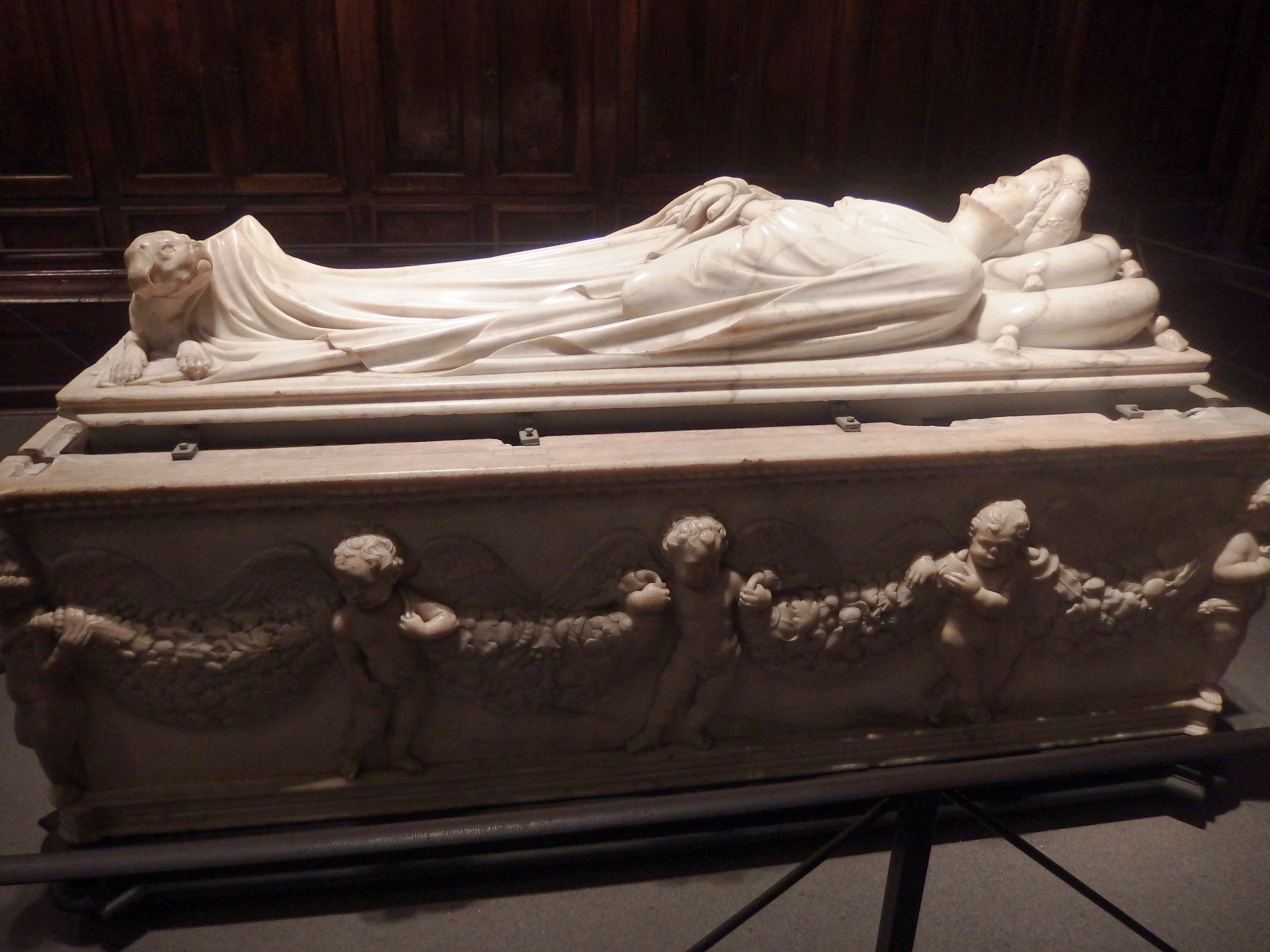
Renaissance putti on the funerary monument of Ilaria del Carretto, by Jacopo della Quercia, 1406–1408, marble, Lucca Cathedral, Lucca, Italy

Putti are a classical motif found primarily on child sarcophagi of the 2nd century, where they are depicted fighting, dancing, participating in bacchic rites, playing sports, etc.

The putto disappeared during the Middle Ages and was revived during the Quattrocento. The revival of the figure of the putto is generally attributed to Donatello, in Florence, in the 1420s, although there are some earlier manifestations (for example the tomb of Ilaria del Carretto, sculpted by Jacopo della Quercia in Lucca). Since then, Donatello has been called the originator of the putto because of the contribution to art he made in restoring the classical form of putto. He gave putti a distinct character by infusing the form with Christian meanings and using it in new contexts such as musician angels. Putti also began to feature in works showing figures from classical mythology, which became popular in the same period.

Some of Donatello's putti are rather older than the usual toddler type, and also behaving in a less than angelic way. The bronze figure of Amore-Attis is the most extreme of these. These are often termed spiritelli, sometimes translated as "imps". Older putto-like figures are seen in other art; they are very typical as winged teenage boys in the borders of works by the Embriachi workshop from the years around 1400.

Most Renaissance putti are essentially decorative and they ornament both religious and secular works, without usually taking any actual part in the events depicted in narrative paintings. There are two popular forms of the putto as the main subject of a work of art in 16th-century Italian Renaissance art: the sleeping putto and the standing putto with an animal or other object.

== Where putti are found ==
Putti, cupids, and angels (see below) can be found in both religious and secular art from the 1420s in Italy, the turn of the 16th century in the Netherlands and Germany, the Mannerist period and late Renaissance in France, and throughout Baroque ceiling frescoes. Many artists have depicted them, but among the best-known are the sculptor Donatello and the painter Raphael. The two relaxed and curious putti who appear at the foot of Raphael's Sistine Madonna are often reproduced.

They also experienced a major revival in the 19th century, where they gamboled through paintings by French academic painters, from advertisements to Gustave Doré’s illustrations for Orlando Furioso.

=== Iconography of the putto ===
The iconography of putti is deliberately unfixed, so that it is difficult to tell the difference between putti, cupids, and various forms of angels. They have no unique, immediately identifiable attributes, so that putti may have many meanings and roles in the context of art.

Some of the more common associations are:

- Associations with Aphrodite, and so with romantic—or erotic—love
- Associations with Heaven
- Associations with peace, prosperity, mirth, and leisure

== Historiography ==
The historiography of this subject matter is very short. Many art historians have commented on the importance of the putto in art, but few have undertaken a major study. One useful scholarly examination is Charles Dempsey's Inventing the Renaissance Putto.

== Gallery ==
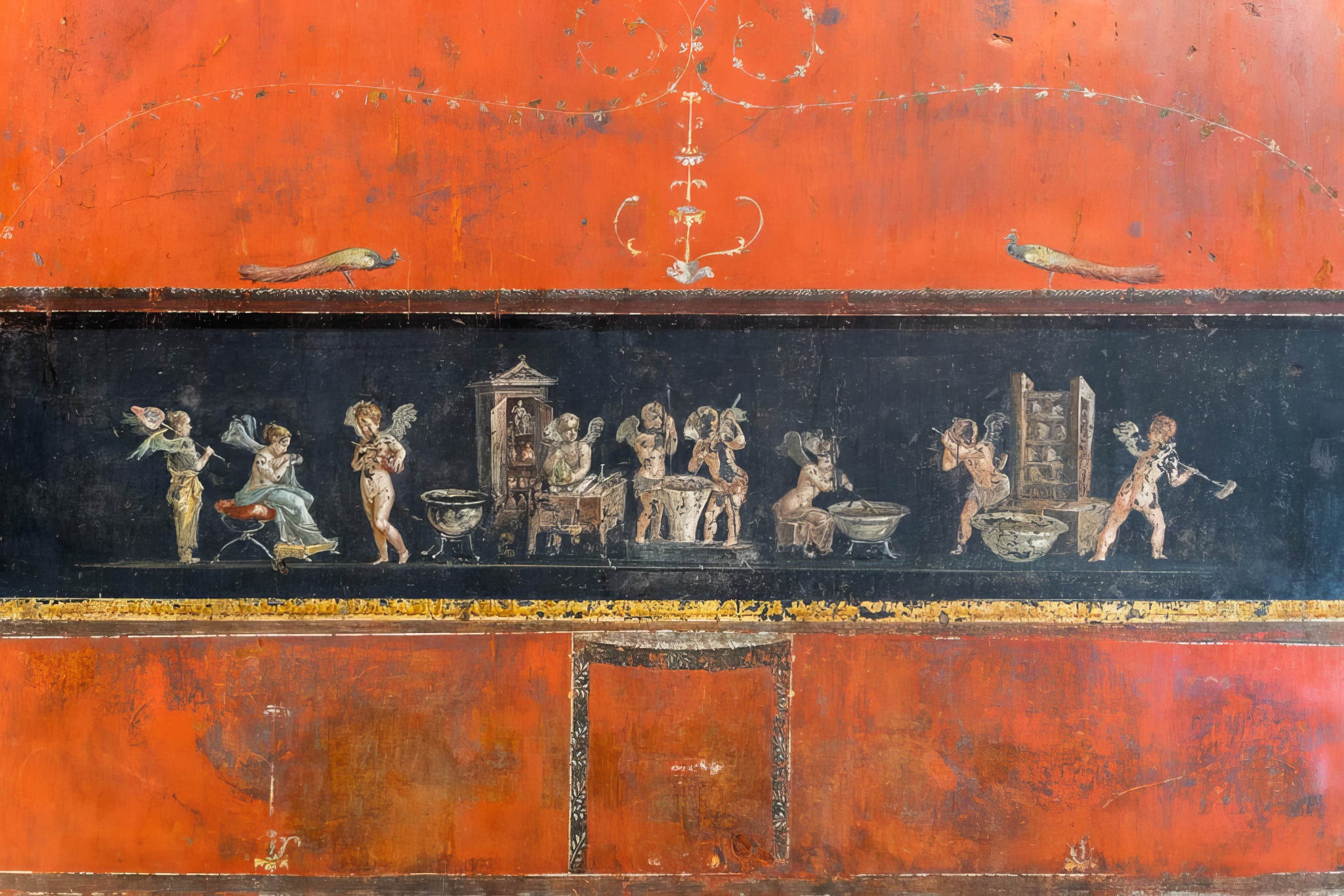
Roman putti frieze, 75–79 AD, fresco, House of the Vettii, Pompeii, Italy

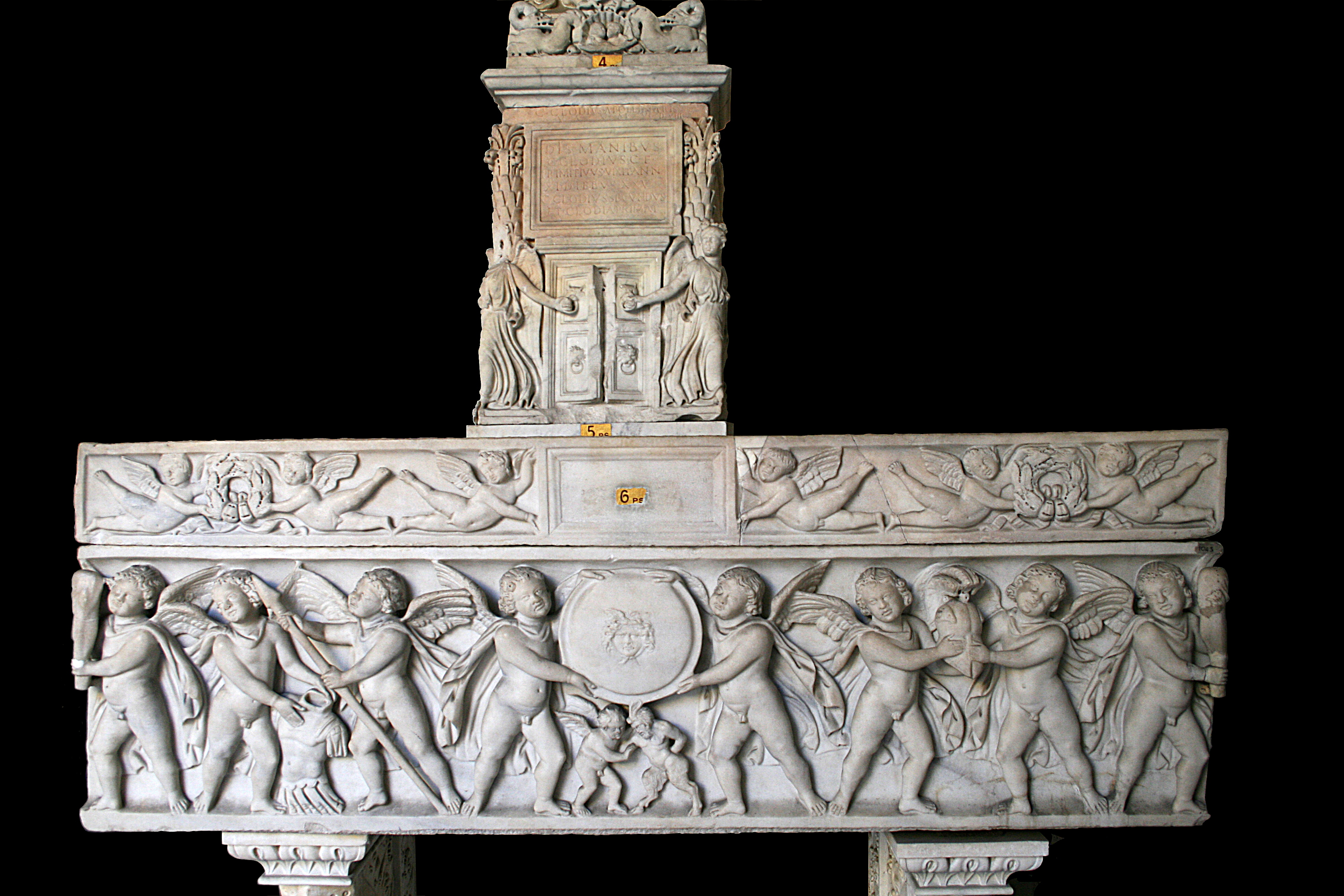
Roman sarcophagus with putti, c. 160 AD, marble, Vatican Museums, Rome, Italy

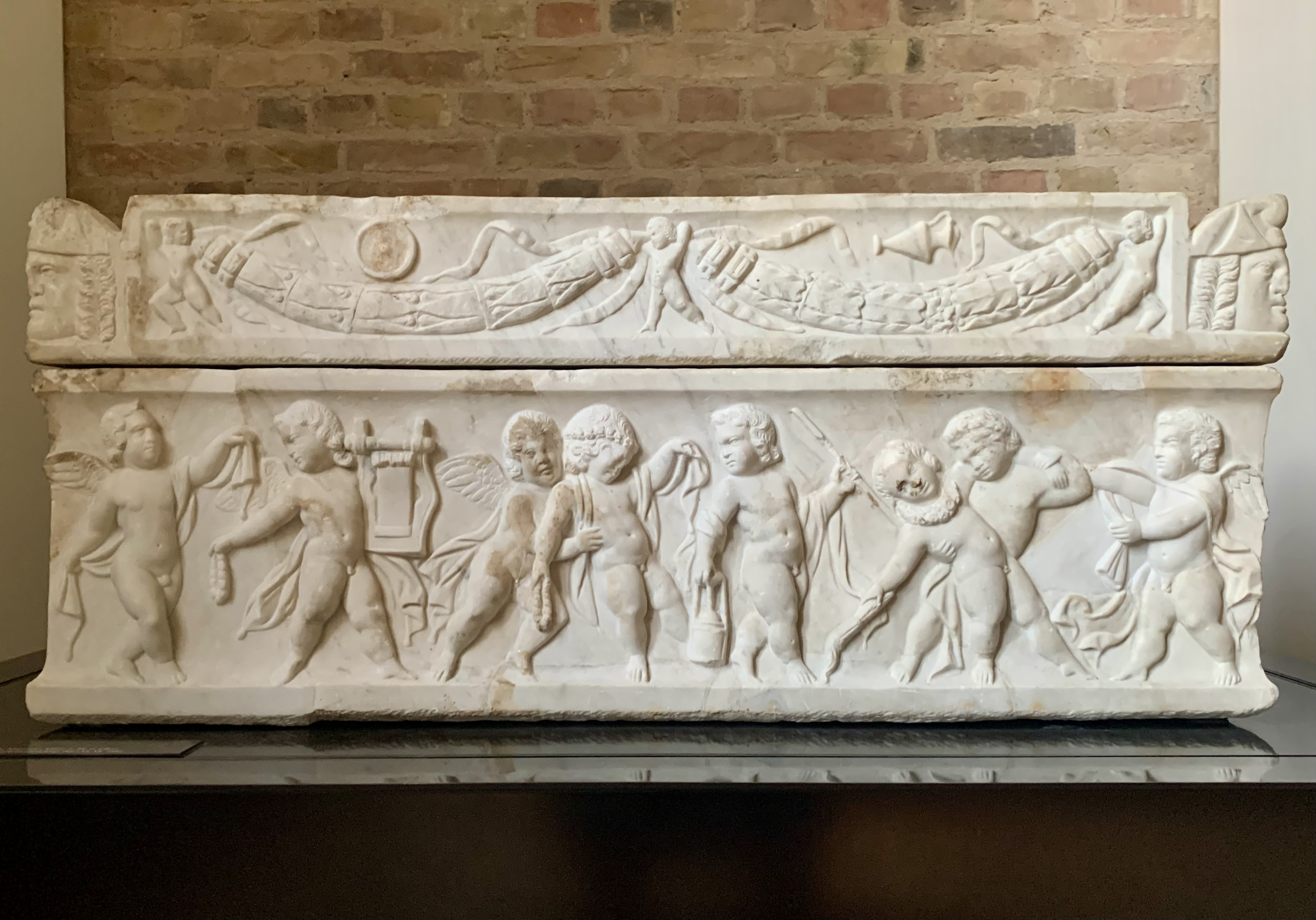
Roman sarcophagus with a procession of drunk putti, which belongs to a child, with a procession of drunk putti, mid-2nd century, marble, Neues Museum, Berlin

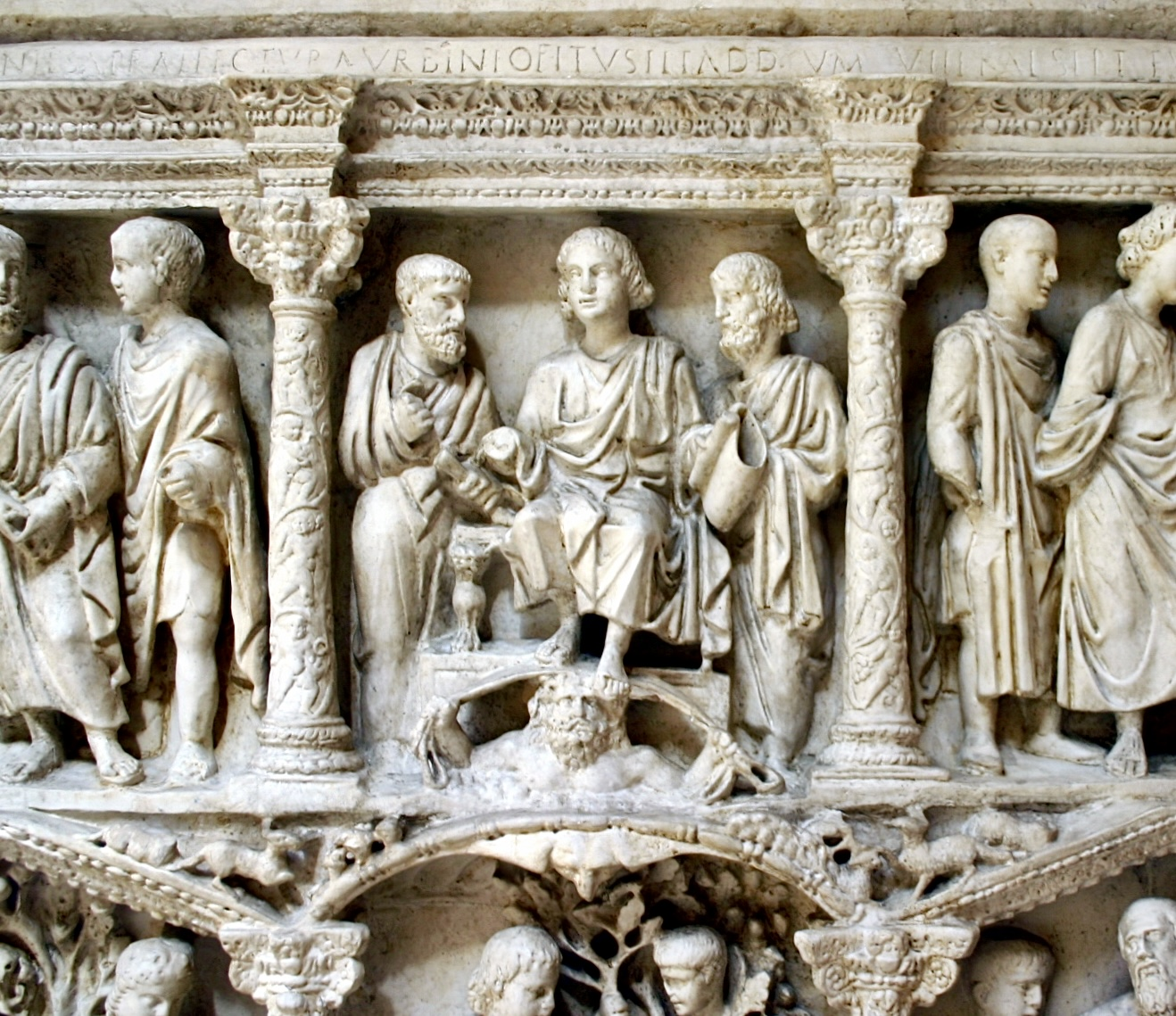
Roman putti on columns of the Sarcophagus of Junius Bassus, 389, marble, Museo del tesoro di San Pietro, St. Peter's Basilica, Vatican City

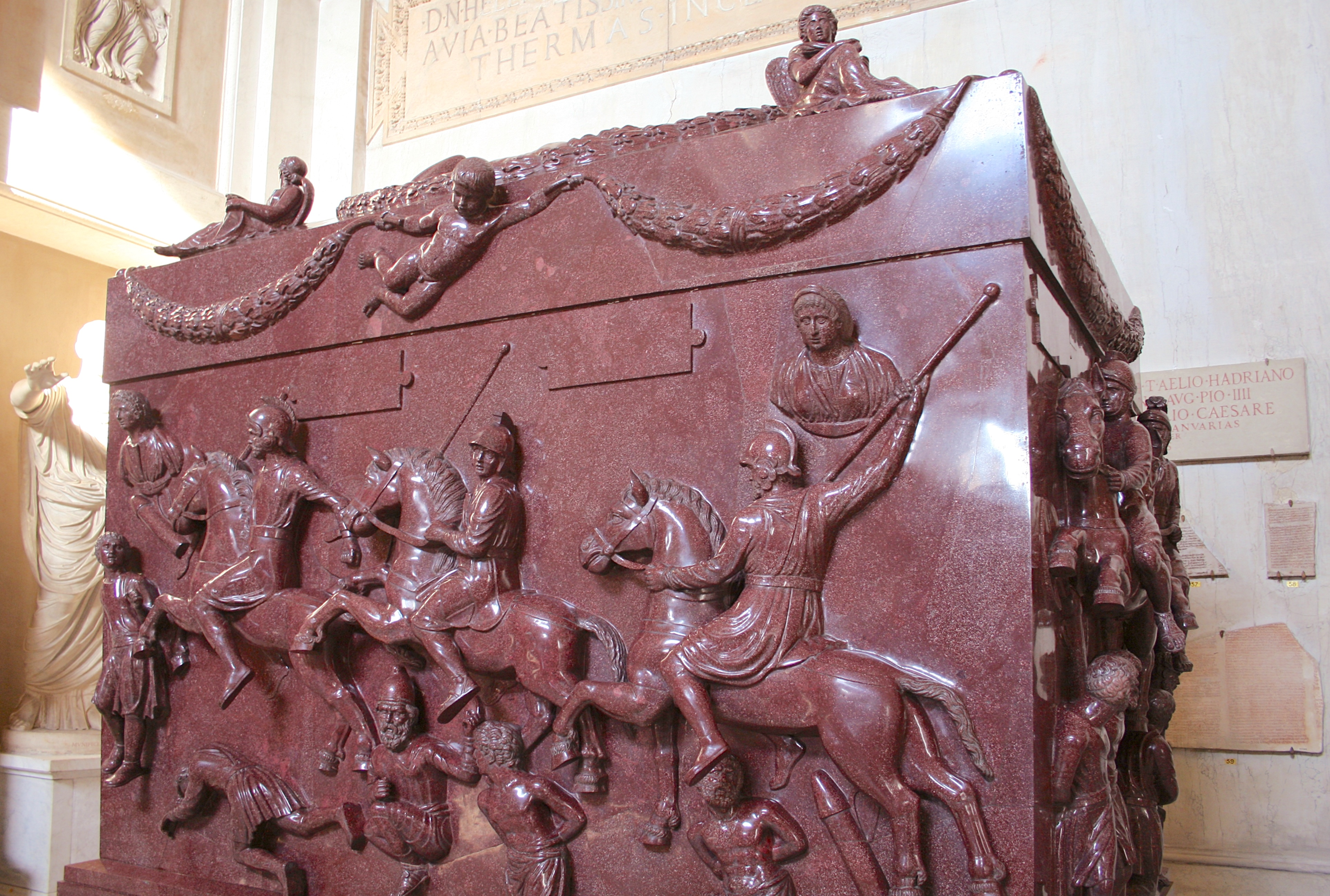
Roman putto on the Sarcophagus of Helena, 4th century, porphyry, Museo Pio-Clementino, part of the Vatican Museums, Rome

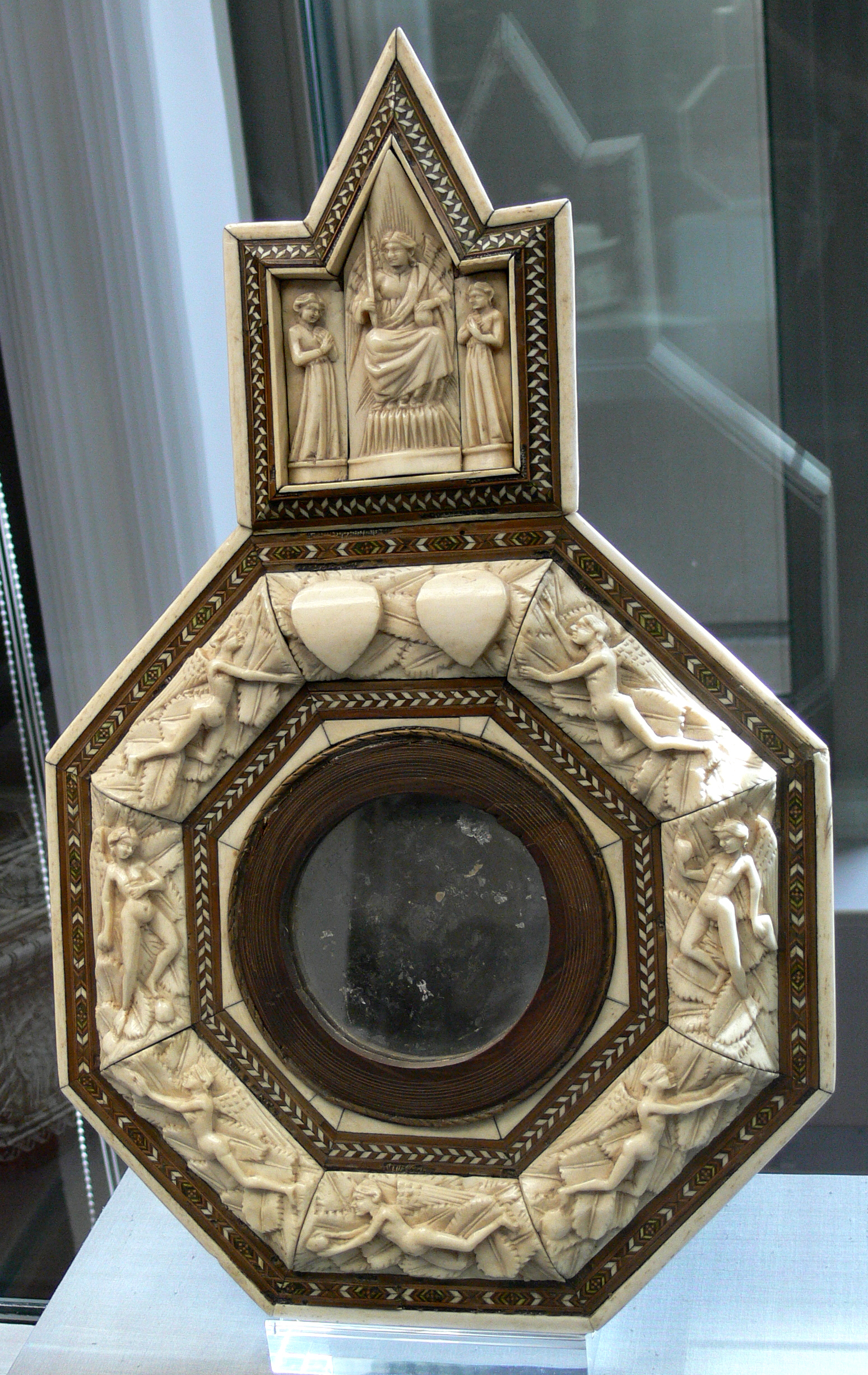
Gothic mirror frame, by the Embriachi workshop, 1st half of the 15th century, wood, bone, horn and bone marquetry, Kunstgewerbemuseum Berlin, Germany

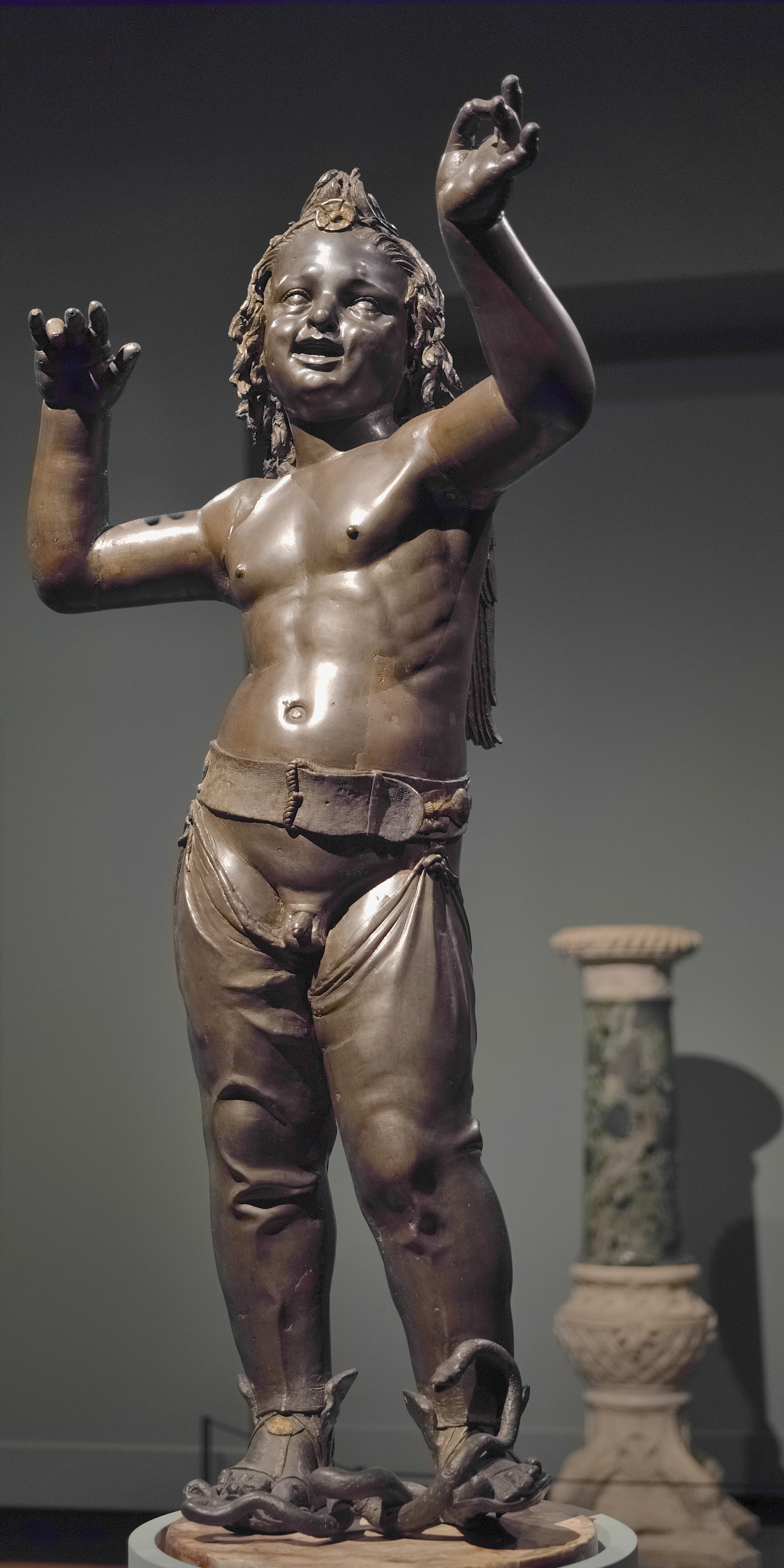
Amore-Attis, by Donatello, 1436–1438, bronze, Bargello, Florence, Italy

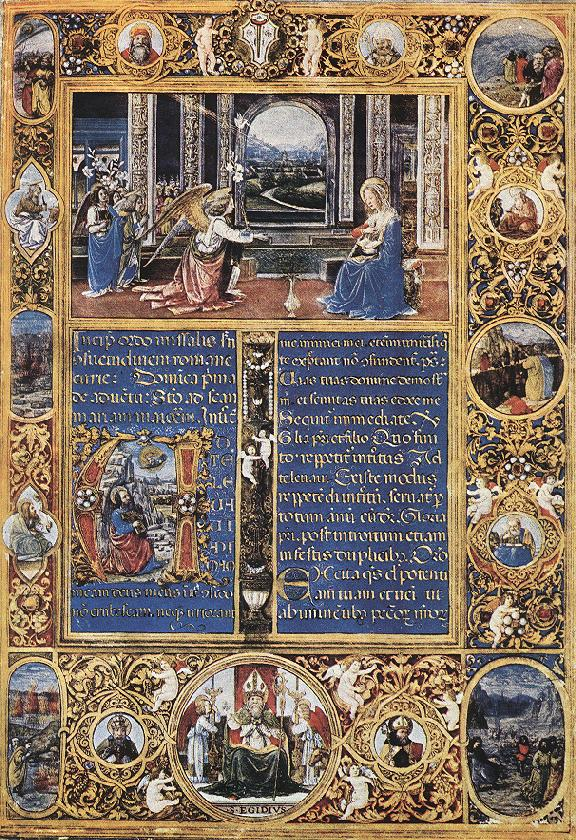
Renaissance putti on a page of Dante's Divine Comedy, by Gherardo di Giovanni del Fora, c. 1474–1476, tempera colors, gold paint, gold leaf, and ink on parchment, Bargello, Florence

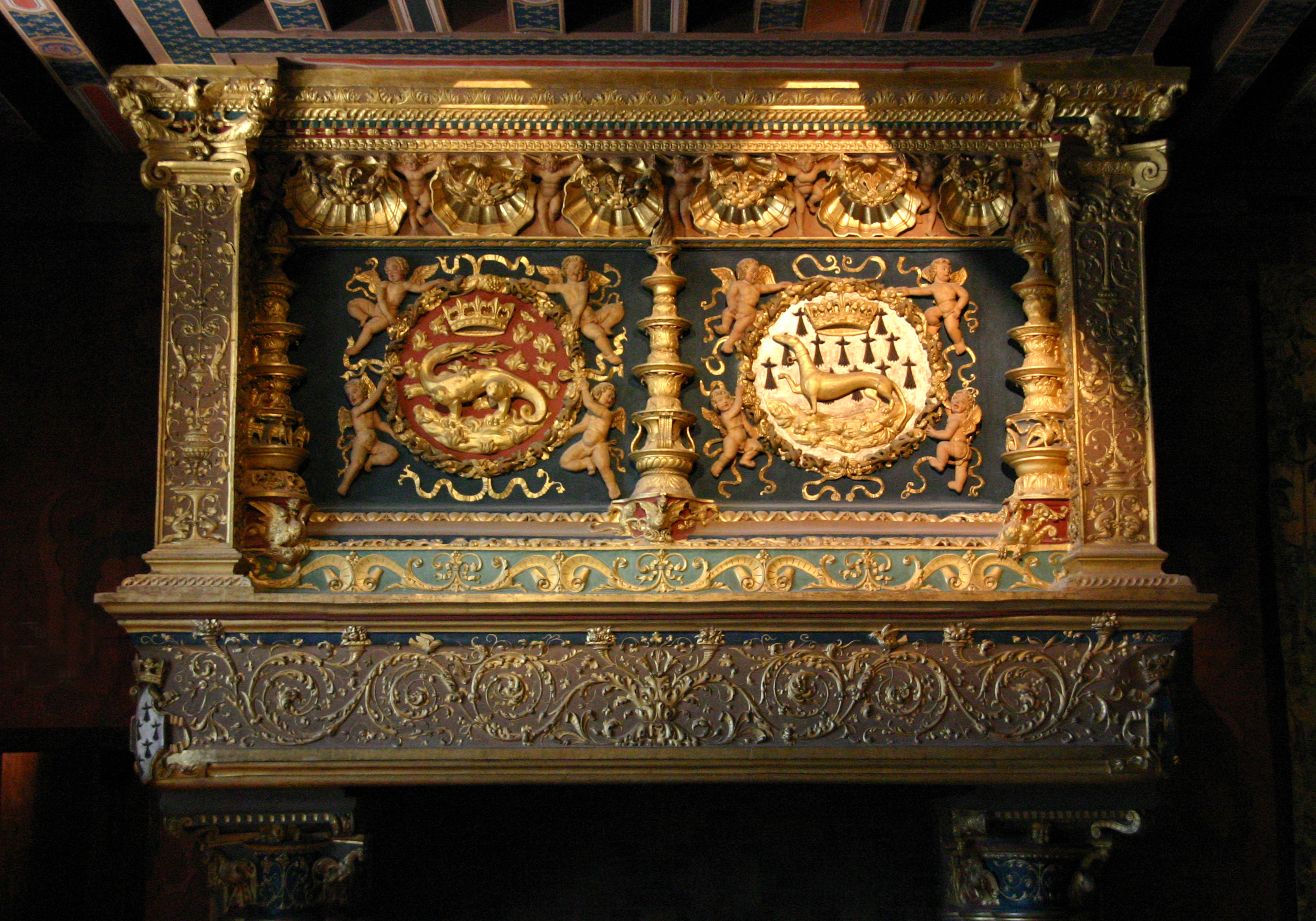
Renaissance putti on an elaborate fireplace with the crests of François I and Claude de France, in the Salle du Roi, Château of Blois, Blois, France, unknown architect, 1515–1524

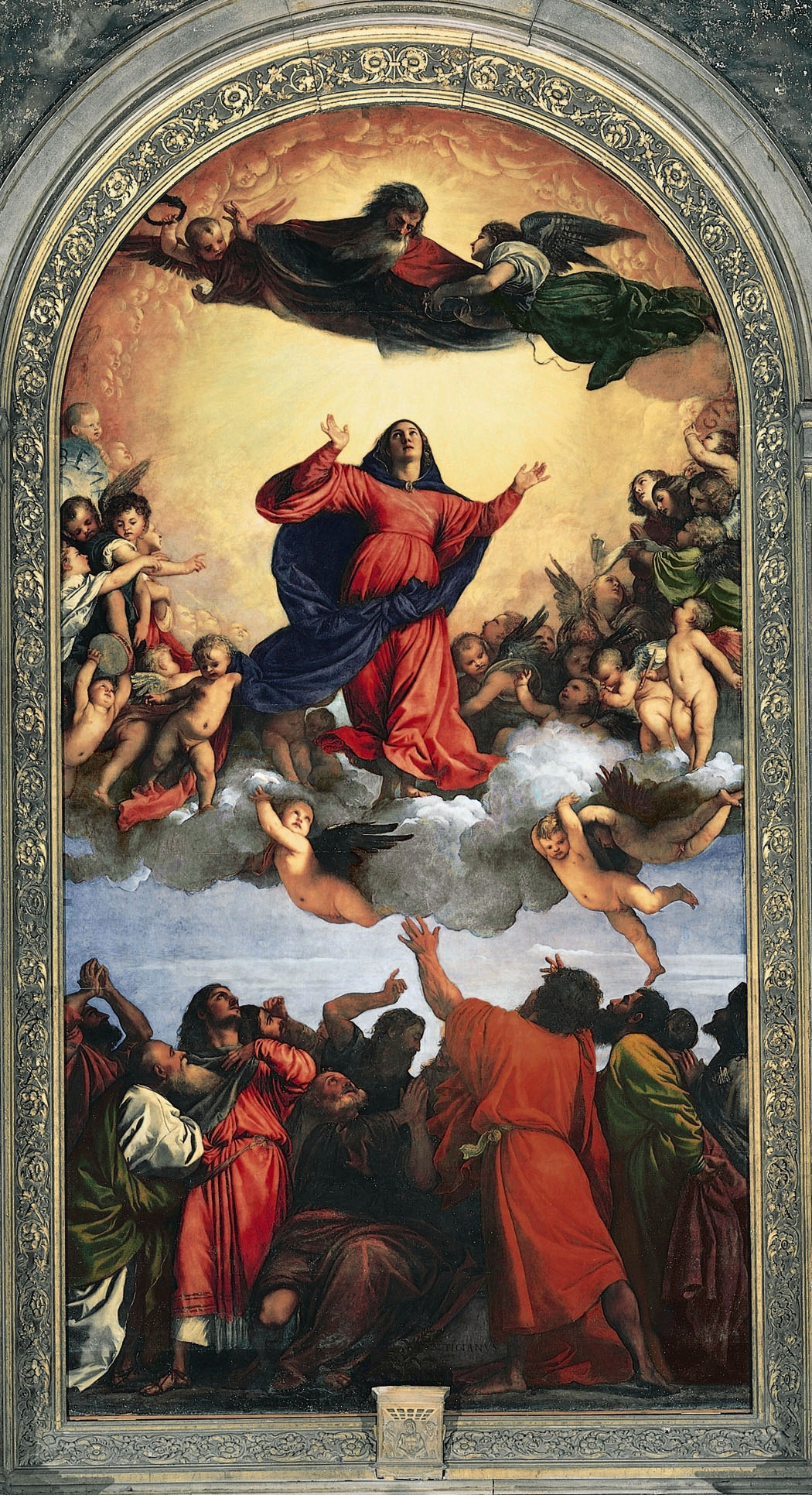
Assumption of the Virgin, by Titian, 1516–1518, oil on panel, Frari Church, Venice, Italy

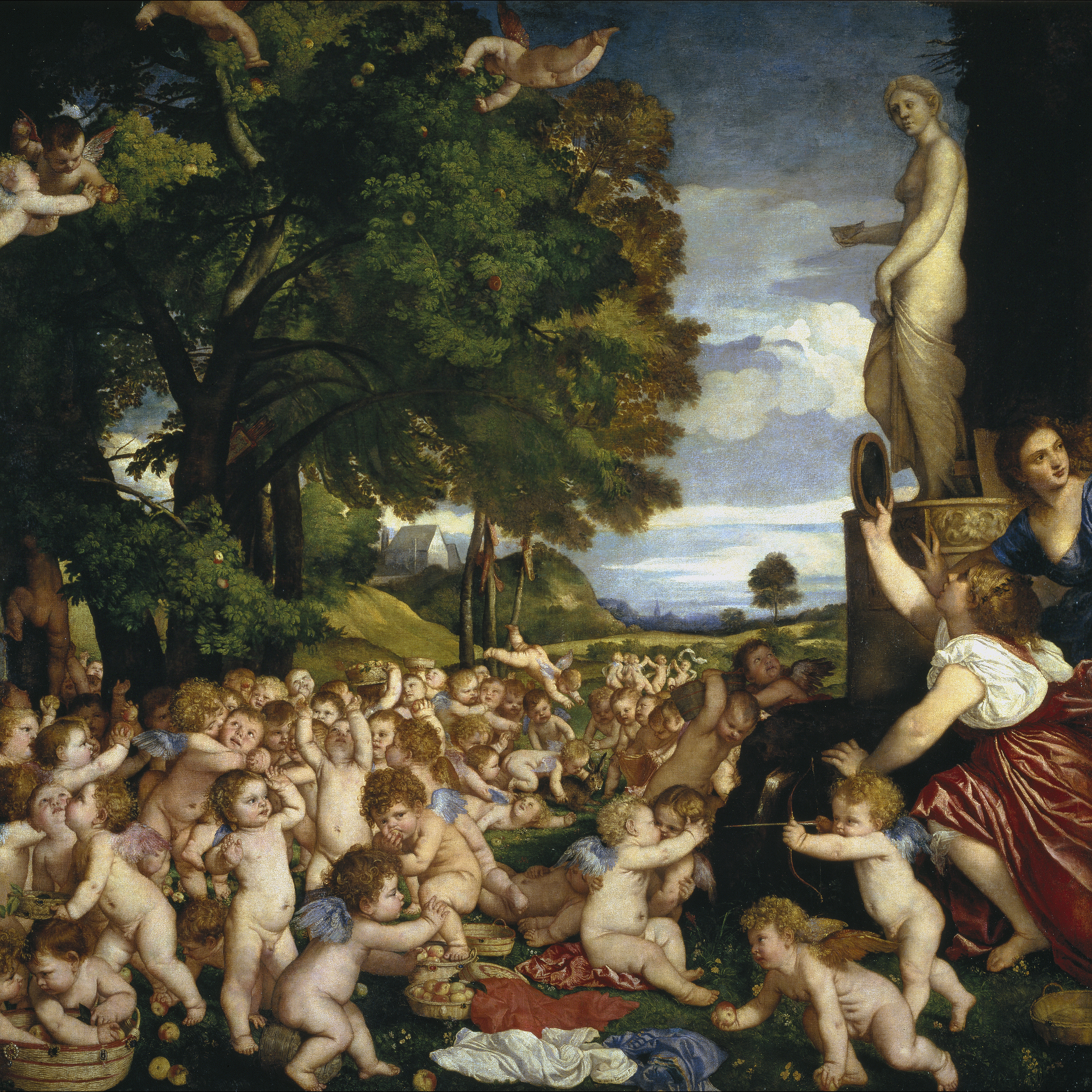
The Offering to Venus, by Titian, 1518–1519, oil on canvas, Museo del Prado, Madrid, Spain

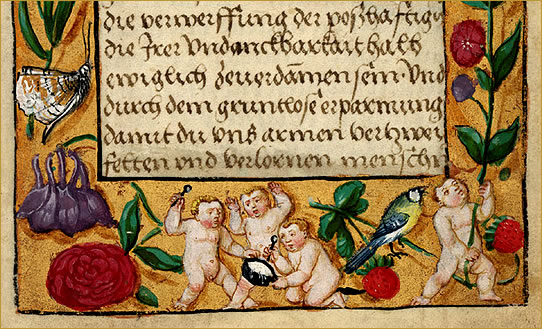
Renaissance putti in the Codex Durlach 2, unknown illustrator, 1520, painted illumination, Baden State Library, Karlsruhe, Germany

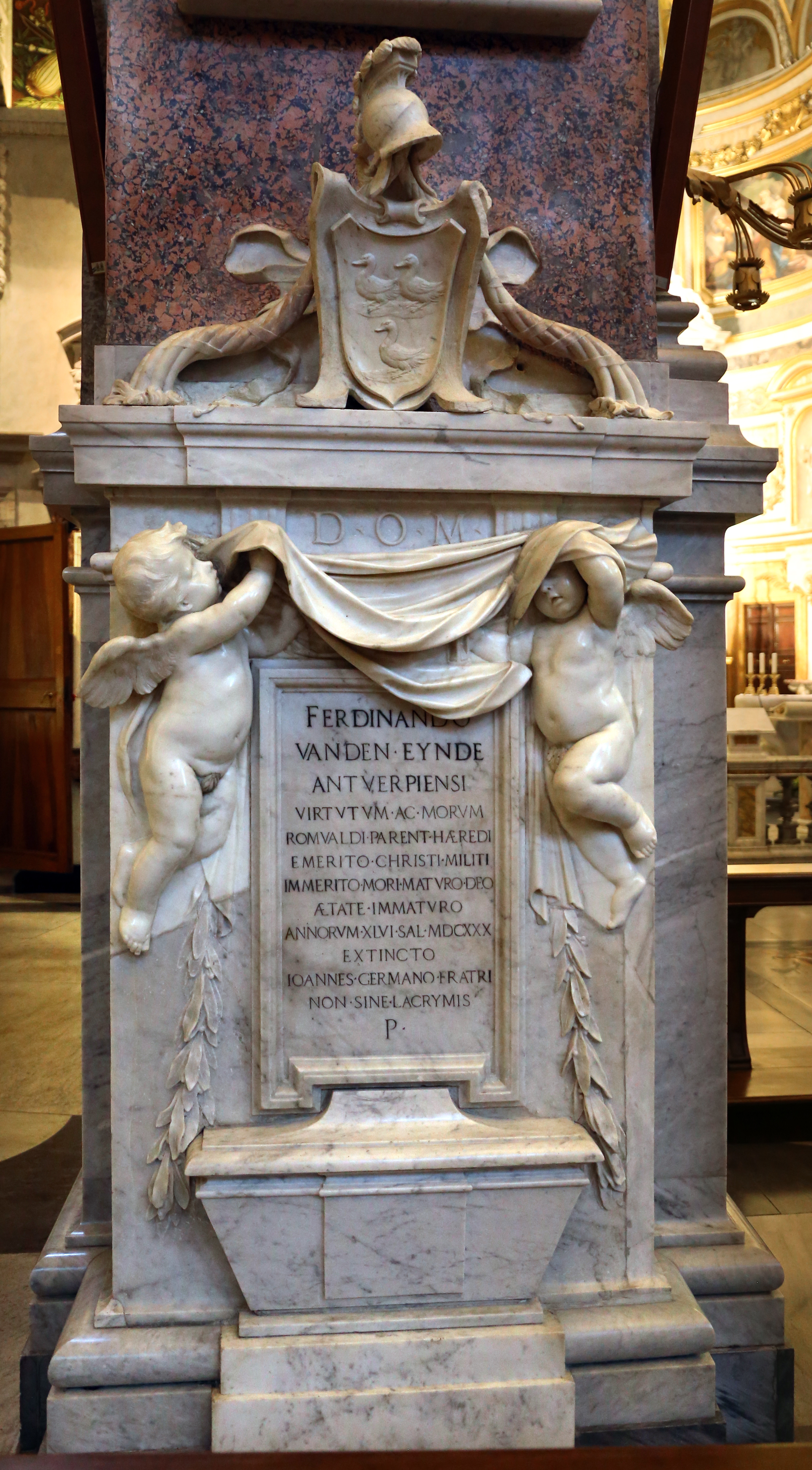
Baroque putti on the Tomb of Ferdinand van den Eynde, designed and executed by François Duquesnoy, 1633–1640, marble, Santa Maria dell'Anima, Rome, Italy

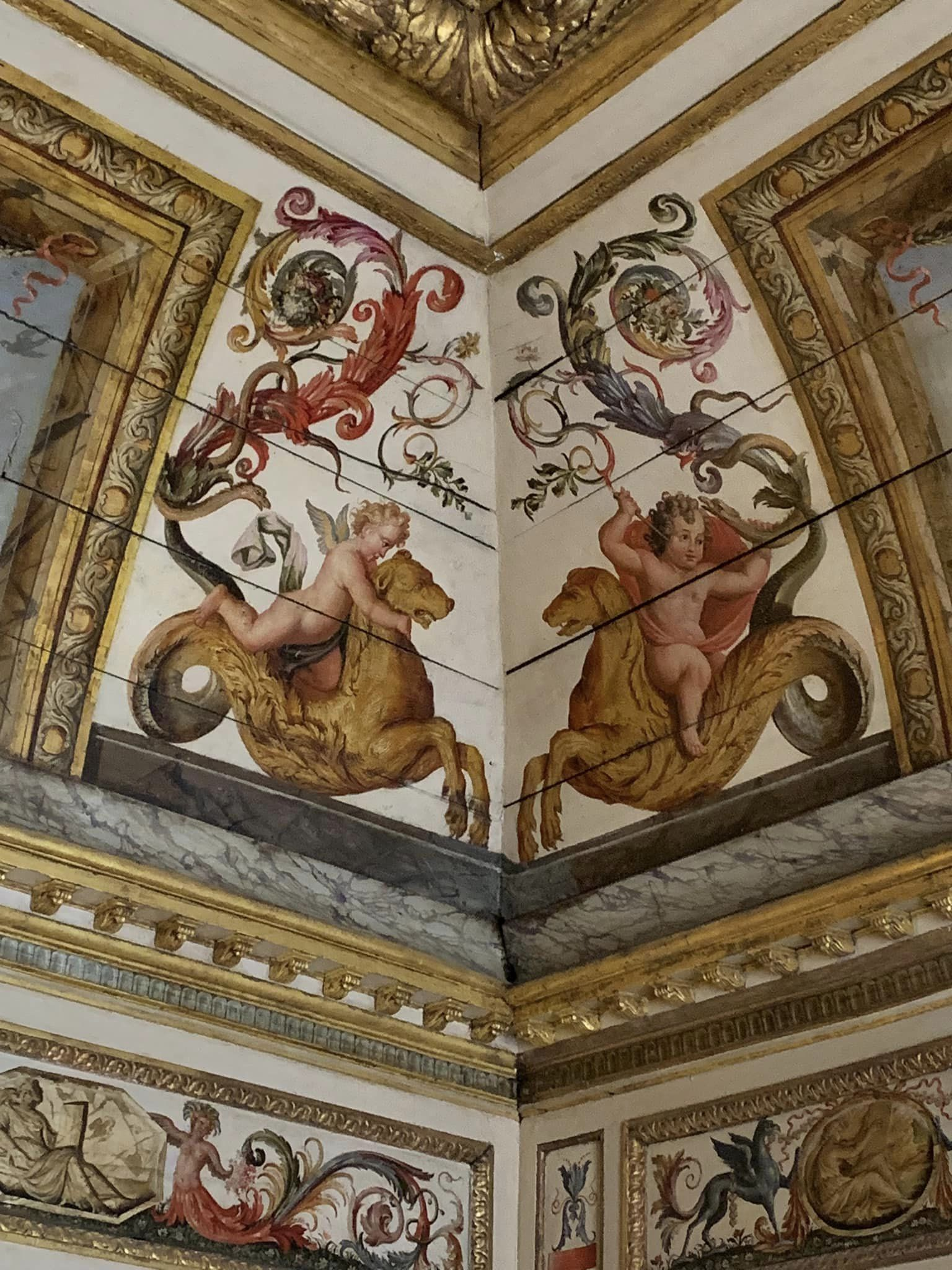
Baroque putti painted on the boiserie of a room from the Hôtel Colbert de Villacerf, now in the Musée Carnavalet, Paris, unknown architect, sculptor and painter, c. 1650

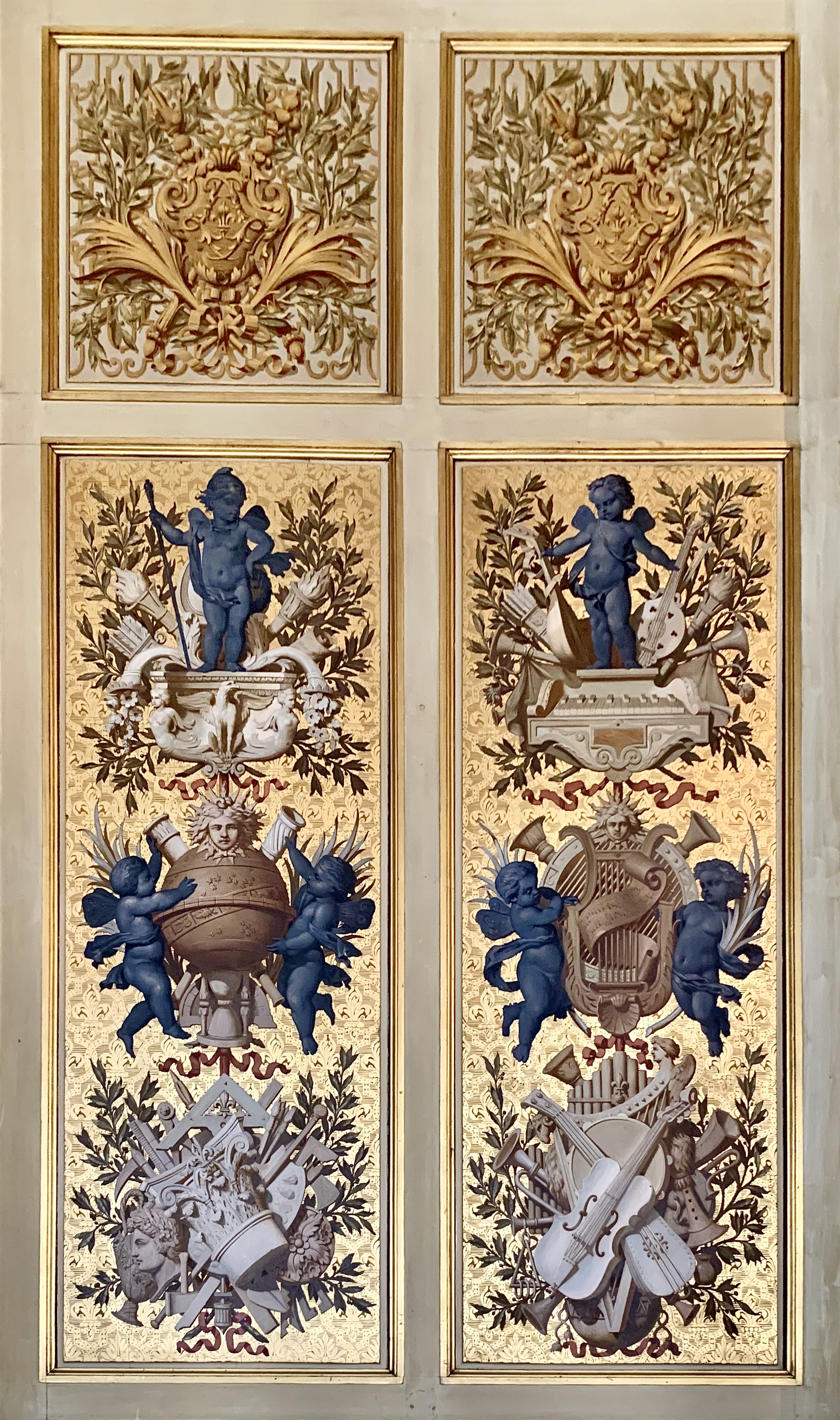
Baroque grotesques with putti on a door in the Galerie d'Apollon, Louvre Palace, Paris, by Louis Le Vau and Charles Le Brun, after 1661

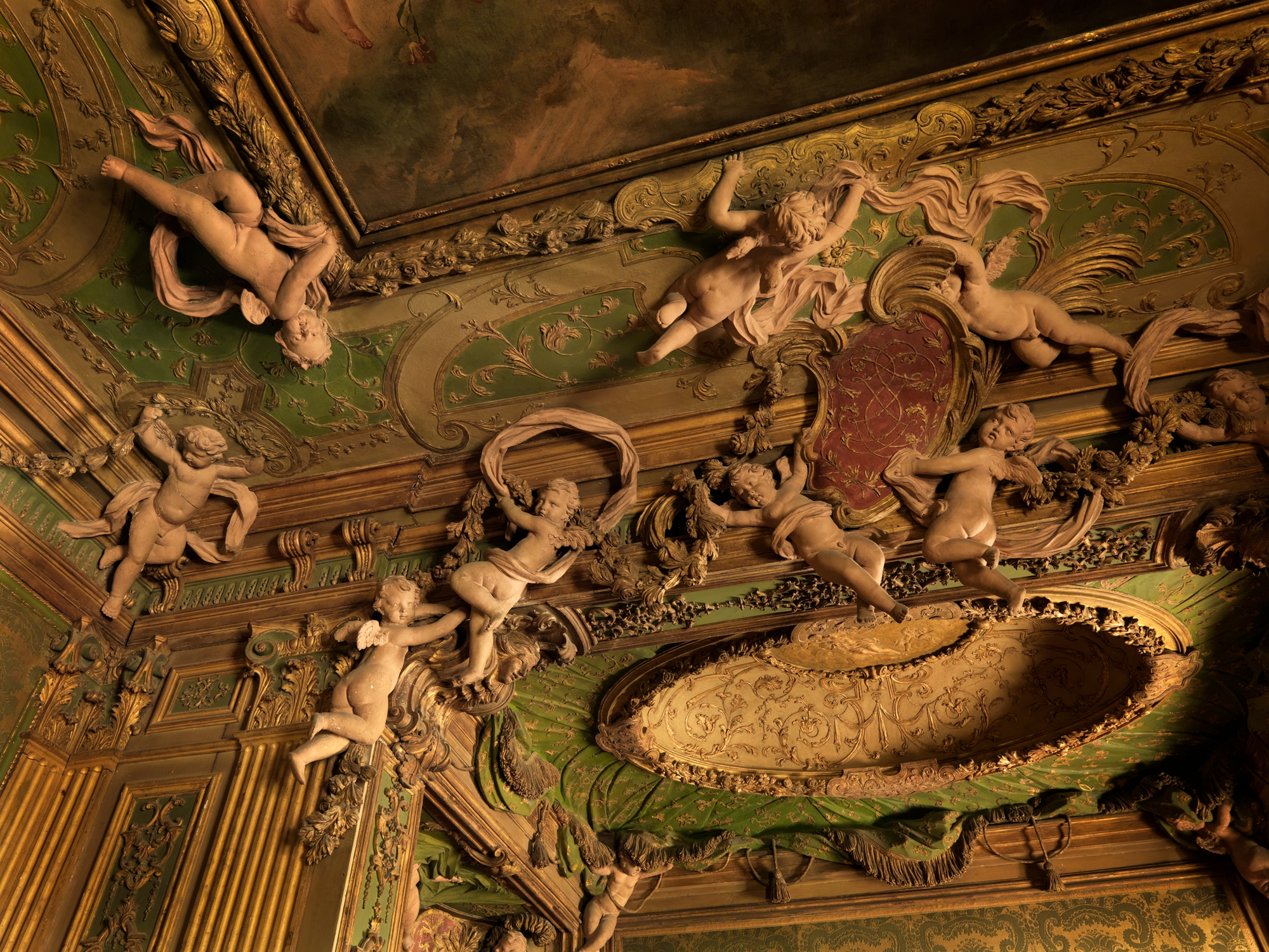
Rococo bedroom from the Ca' Sagredo in Venice, now in the Metropolitan Museum of Art, by Carpoforo Mazzetti Tencalla and Abbondio Stazio, c. 1720 or later

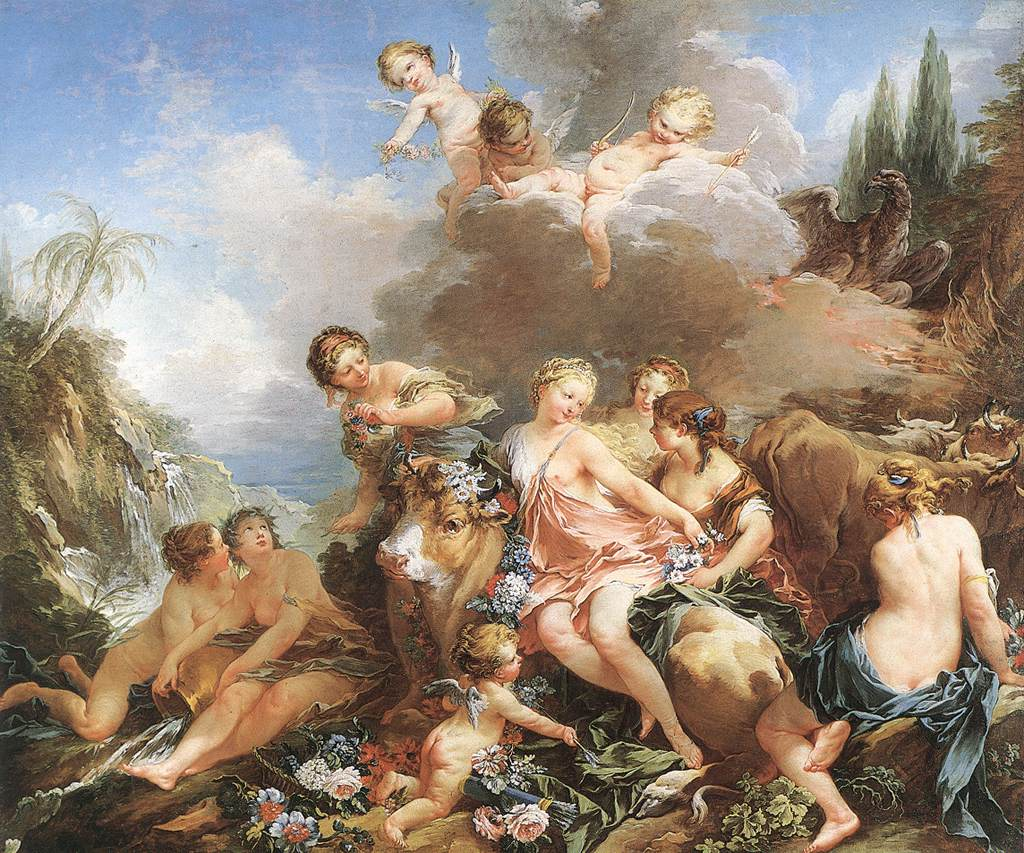
The Rape of Europa, by François Boucher, c. 1732–1734, oil on canvas, Wallace Collection, London, United Kingdom

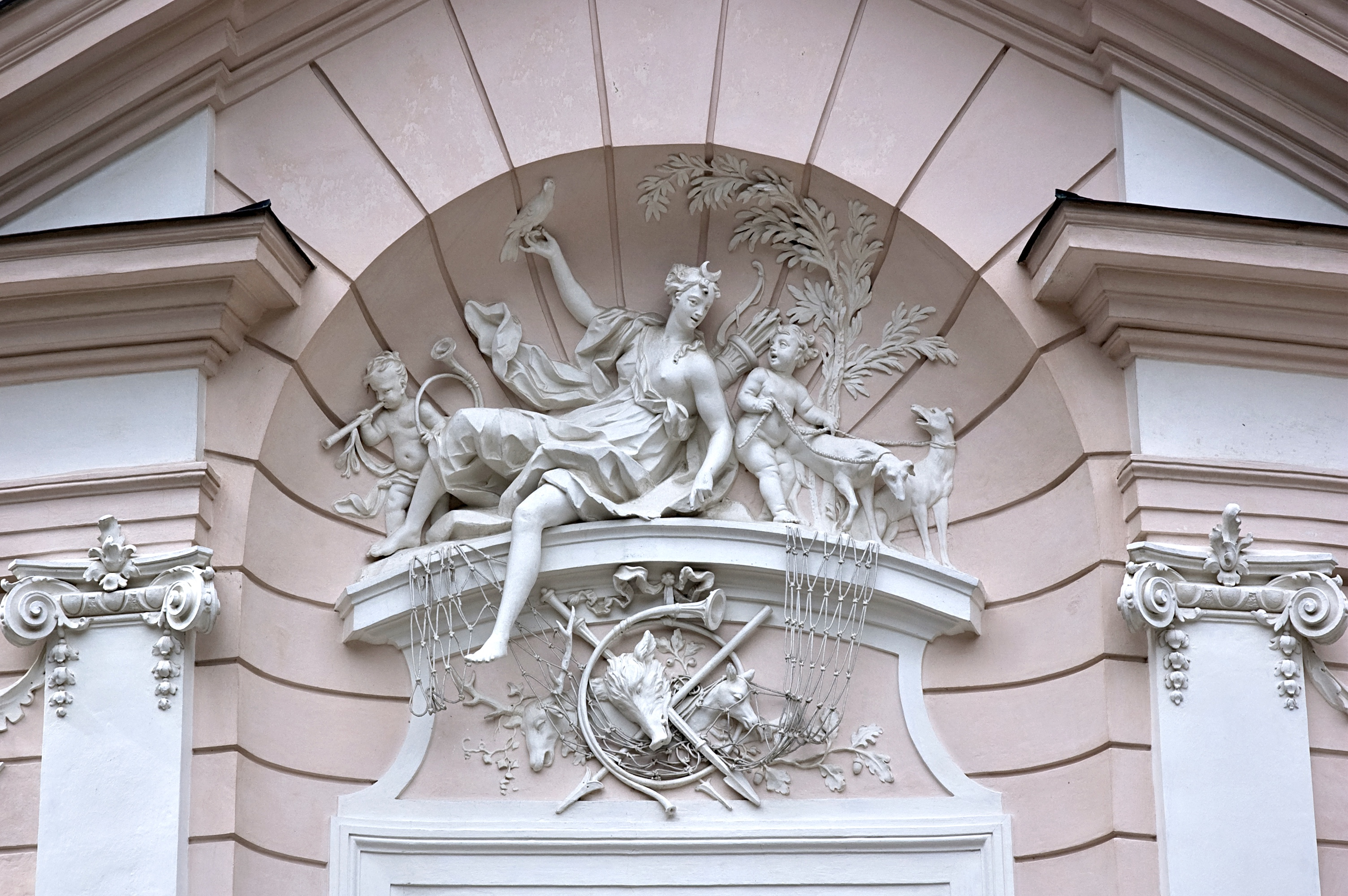
Rococo relief of Diana with two putti above the entrance of the Amalienburg, Munich, Germany, designed by François de Cuvilliés, 1734–1739

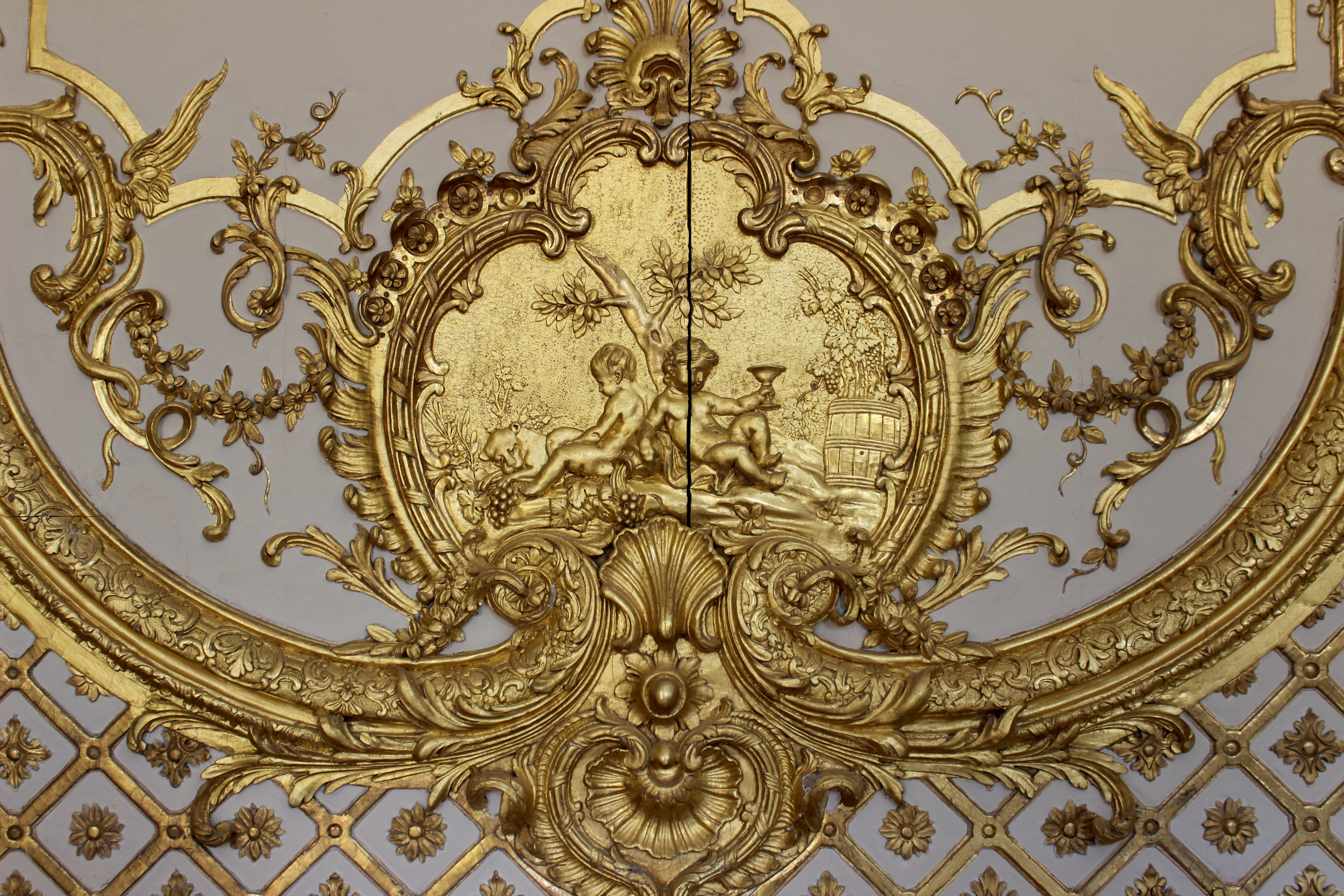
Rococo cartouche with putti in the Cabinet de la Pendule, Palace of Versailles, France, created and sculpted by Jacques Verberckt, 1738

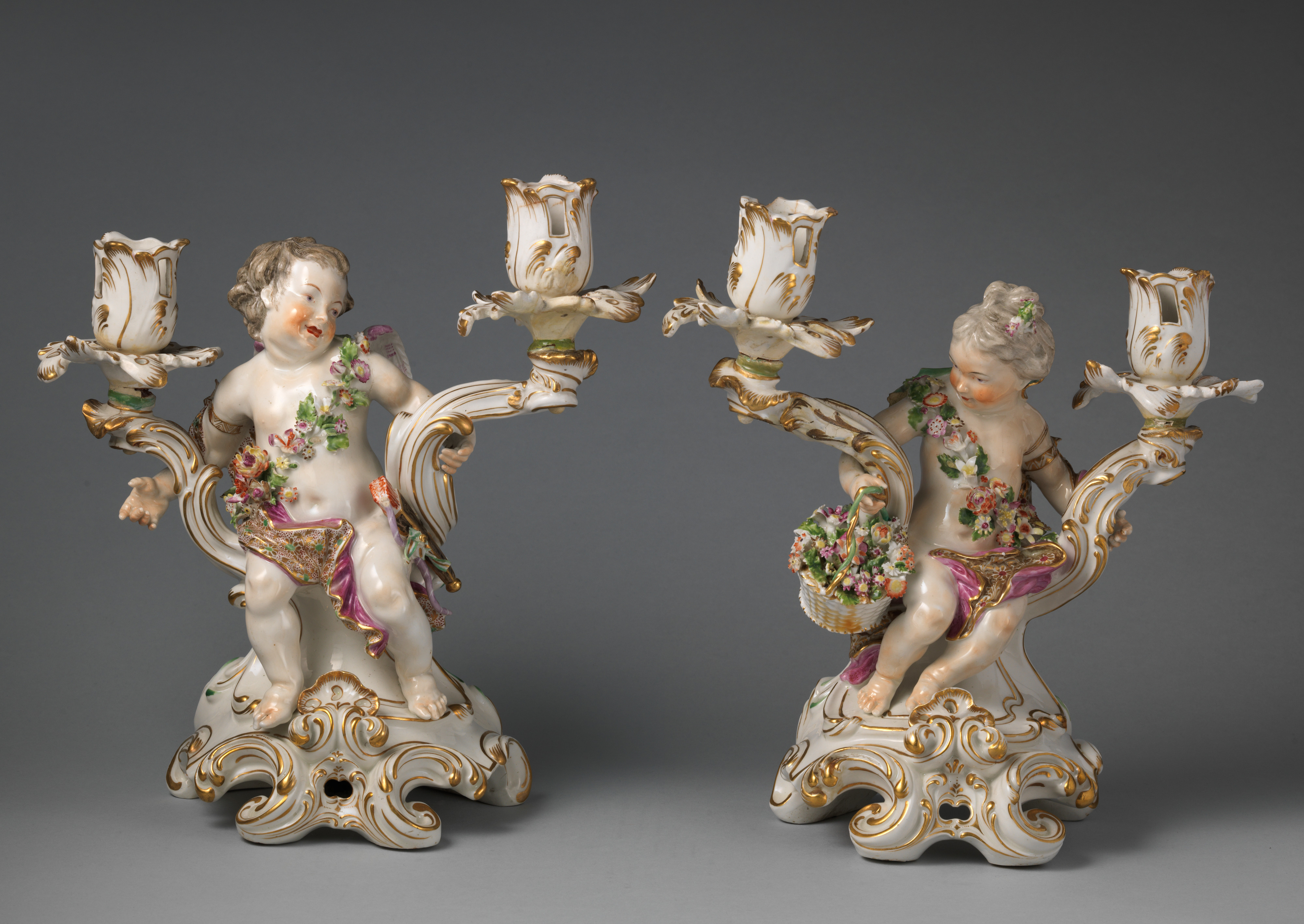
Pair of rococo candelabra, by the Chelsea porcelain factory, 18th century, soft-paste porcelain, Metropolitan Museum of Art

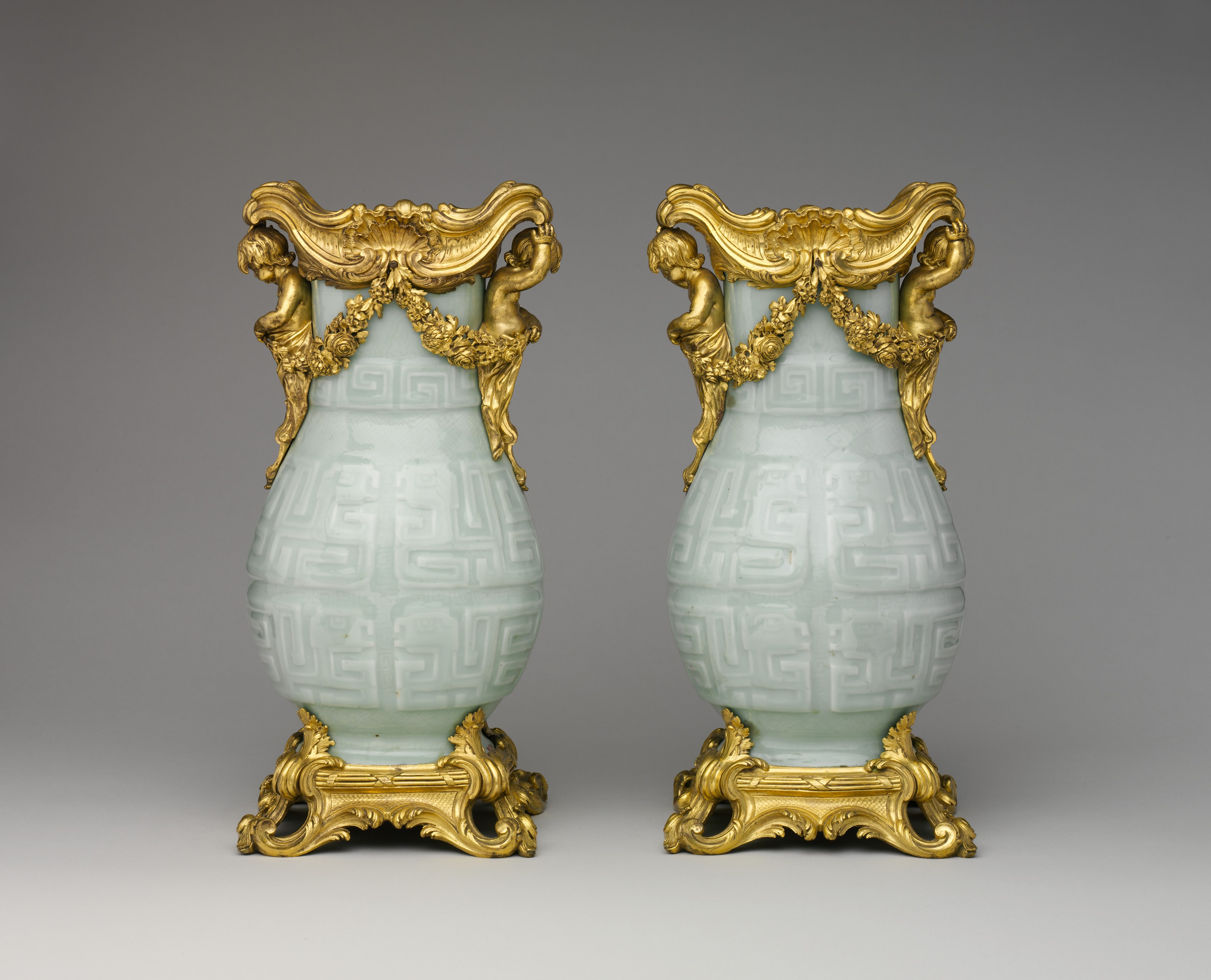
Pair of Chinese vases with French Rococo mounts, the vases: early 18th century, the mounts: 1760–1770, hard-paste porcelain with ormolu mounts, Metropolitan Museum of Art

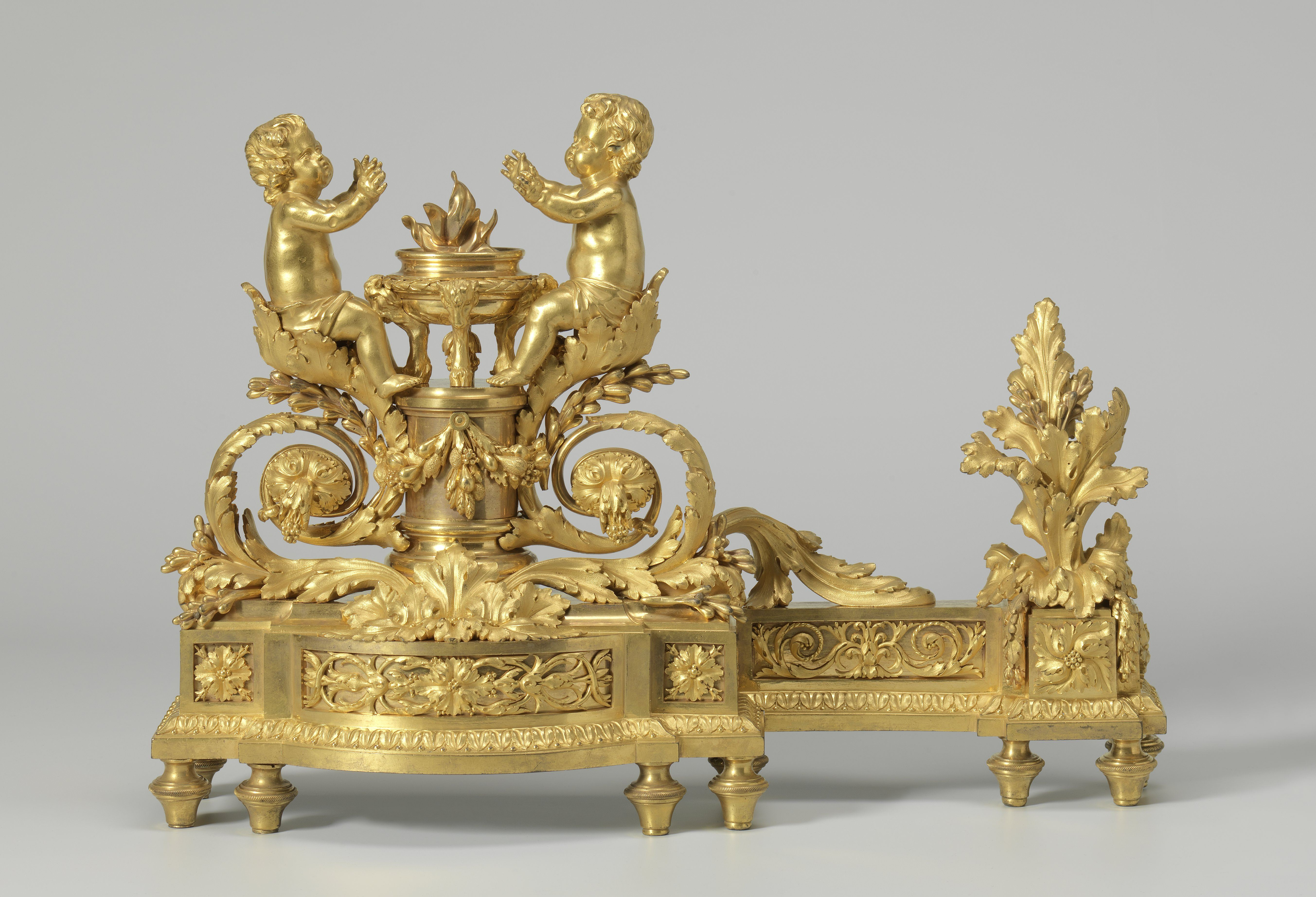
Louis XVI style firedog with putti that warm themselves at a flame, 1780–1790, ormolu, Rijksmuseum, Amsterdam, the Netherlands

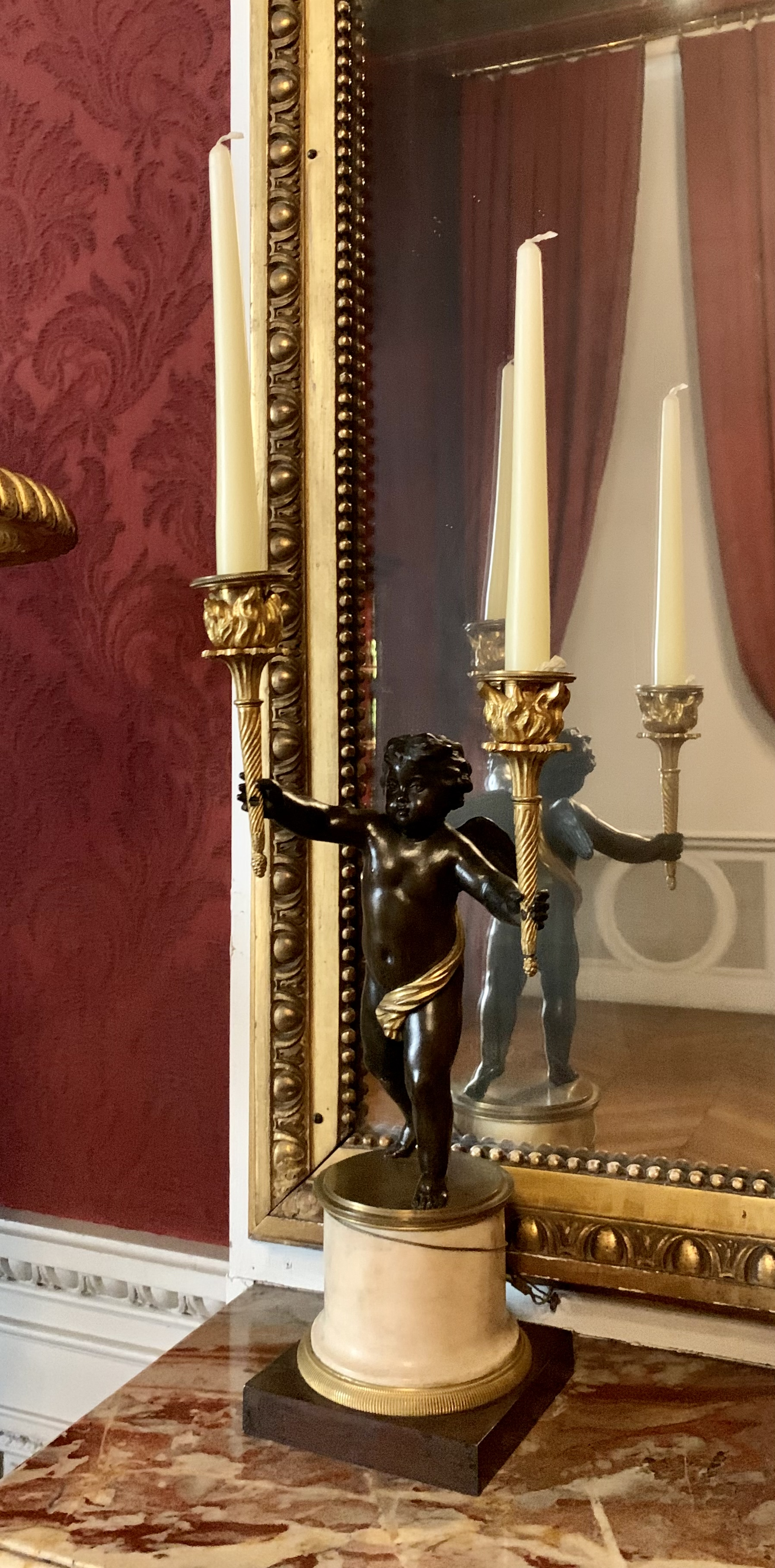
Louis XVI style candelabrum with putto, late 18th century, gilt and patinated bronze, Musée Jacquemart-André, Paris, France

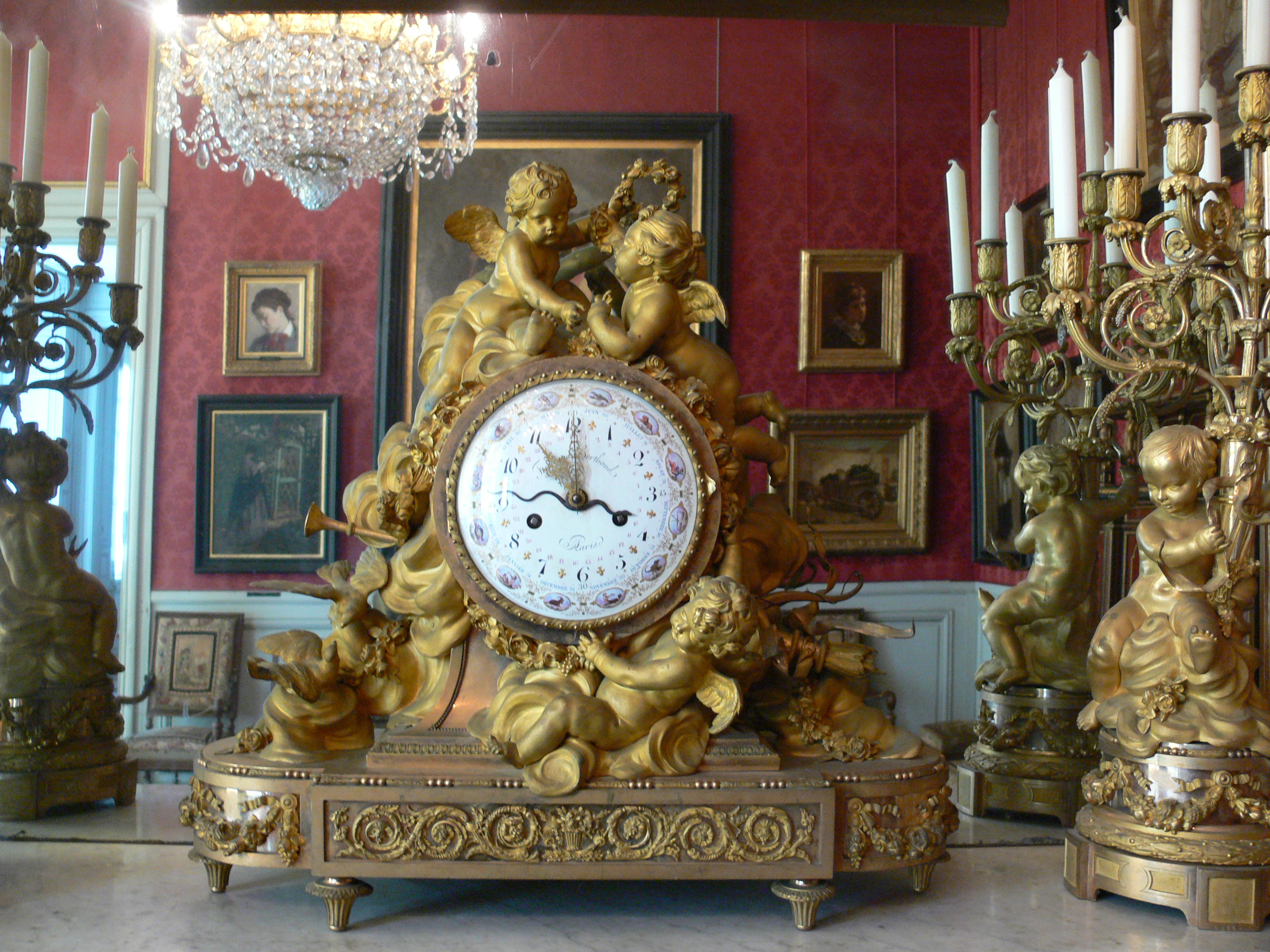
Second Empire style (Louis XVI Revival style) clock, unknown sculptor, dial and mechanism by Ferdinand Berthoud, c. 1860, gilt bronze, Château de Compiègne, France

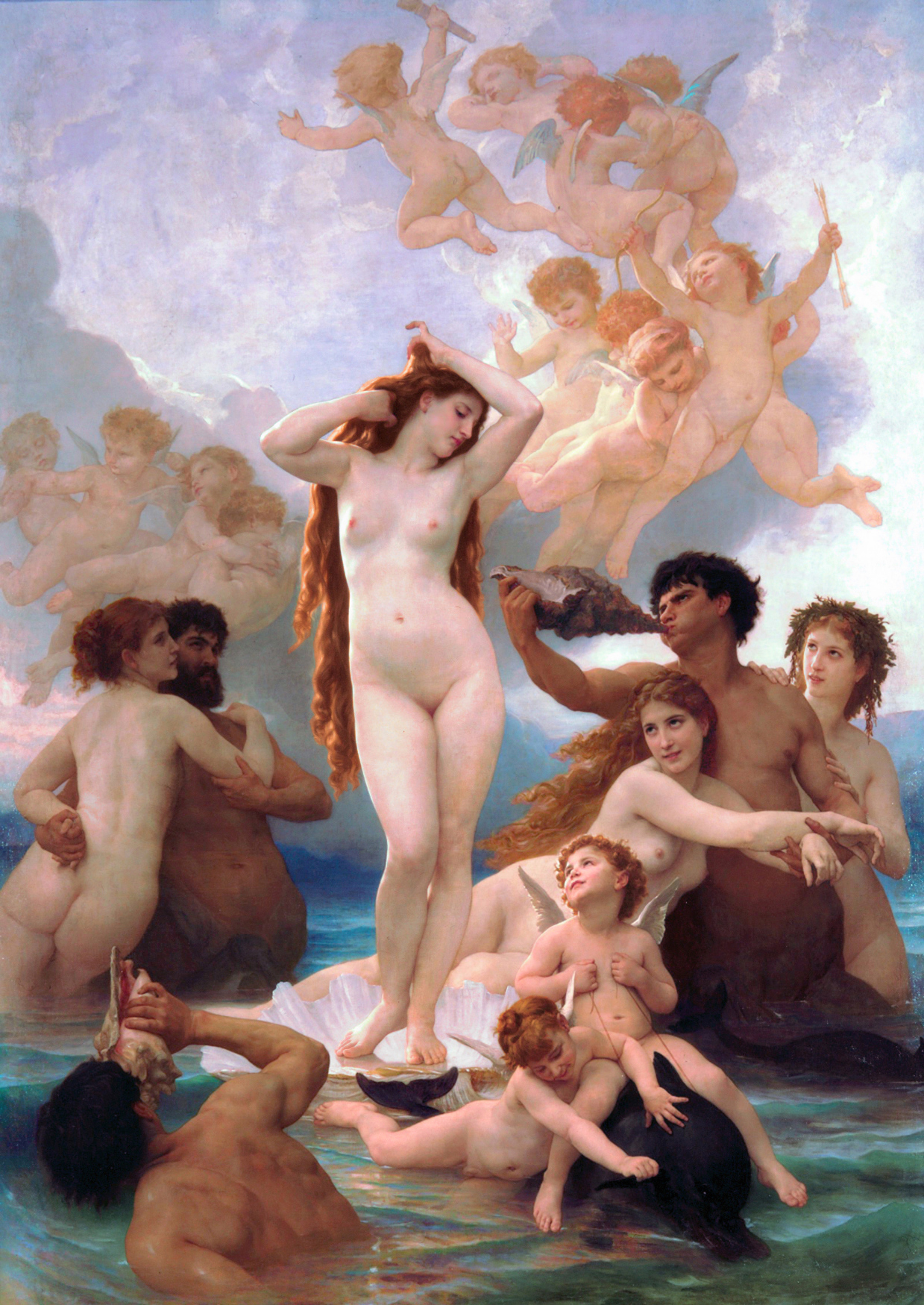
The Birth of Venus, by William-Adolphe Bouguereau, 1879, oil on canvas, Musée d'Orsay, Paris, France

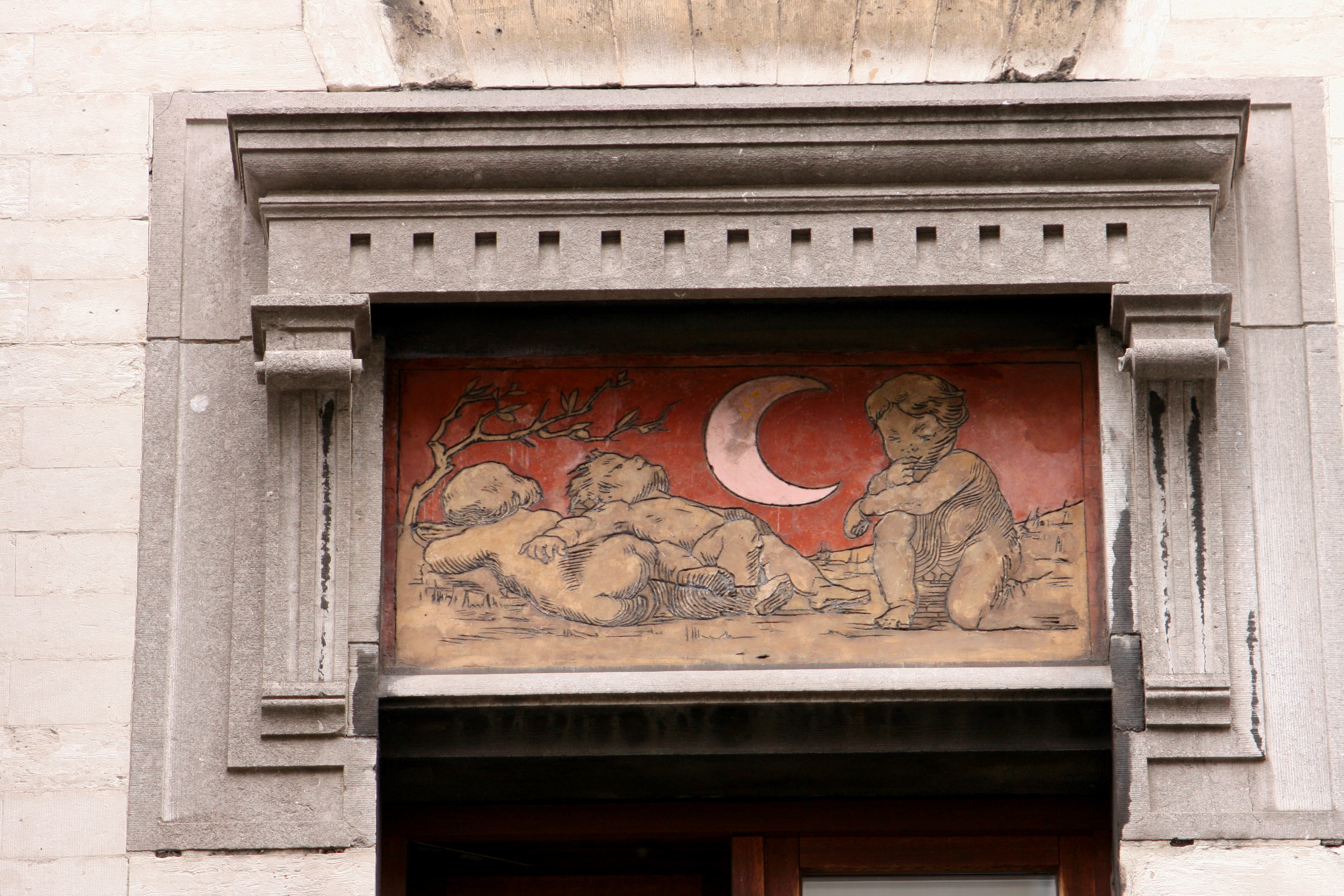
Art Nouveau putti in a sgraffito panel on the House of Jean Baes (Rue Van Moer no. 12), Brussels, Belgium, sgraffito by Henri Baes, 1889

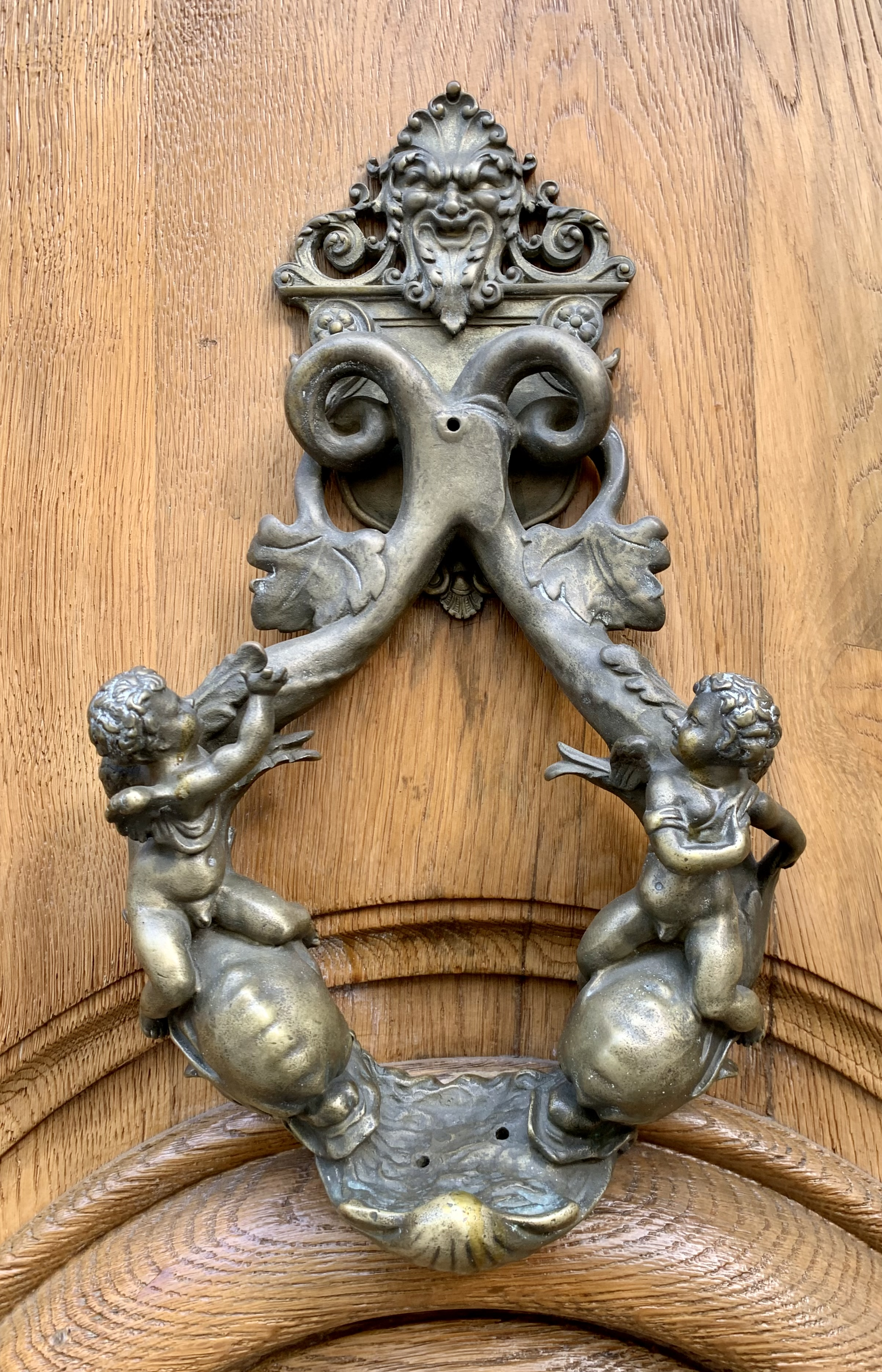
Door knocker of Avenue Kléber no. 21, Paris, France, unknown architect and sculptor, c. 1890

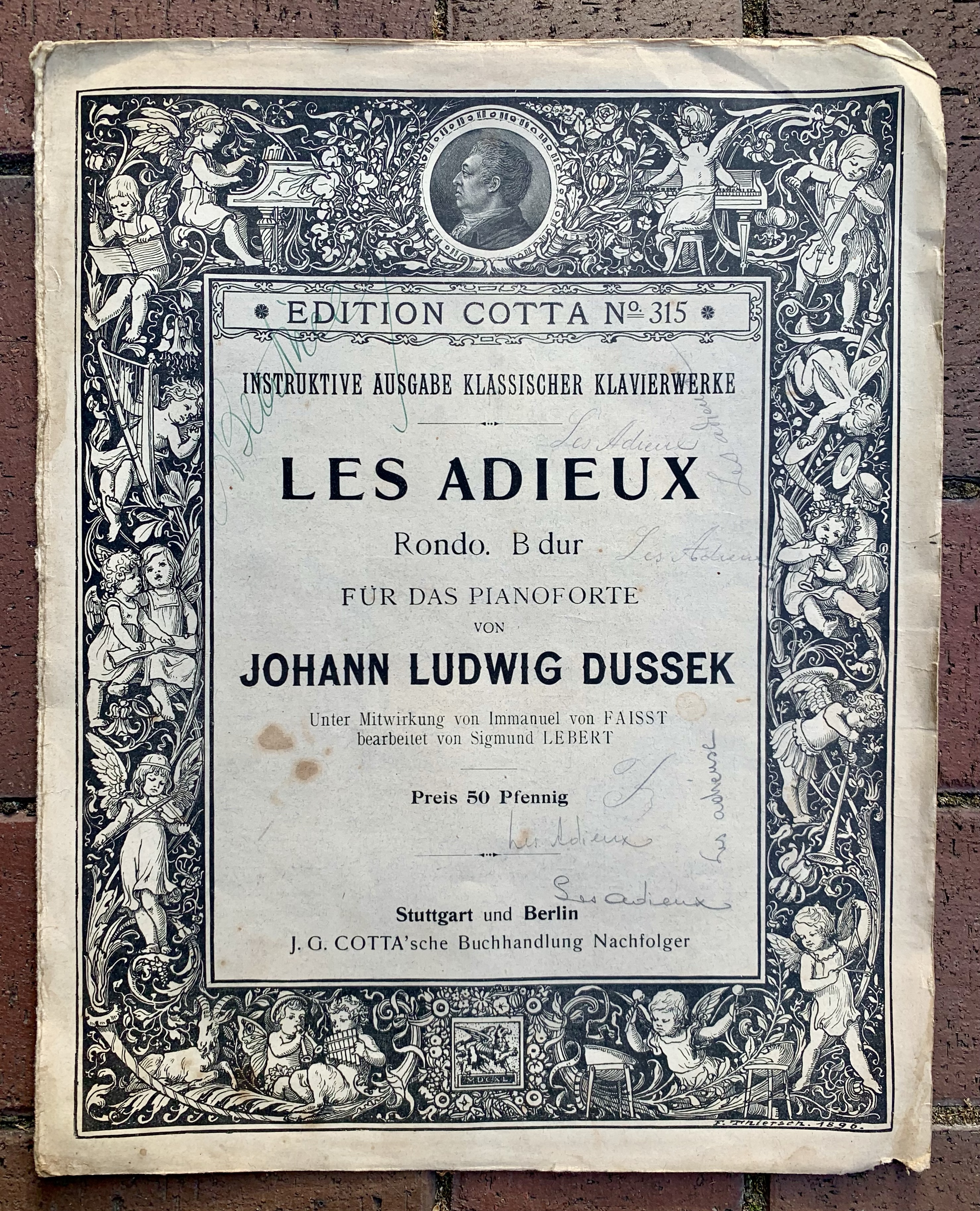
Renaissance Revival putti on the cover of a magazine with sheets of music by Jan Ladislav Dussek, c. 1890, ink on paper, private collection

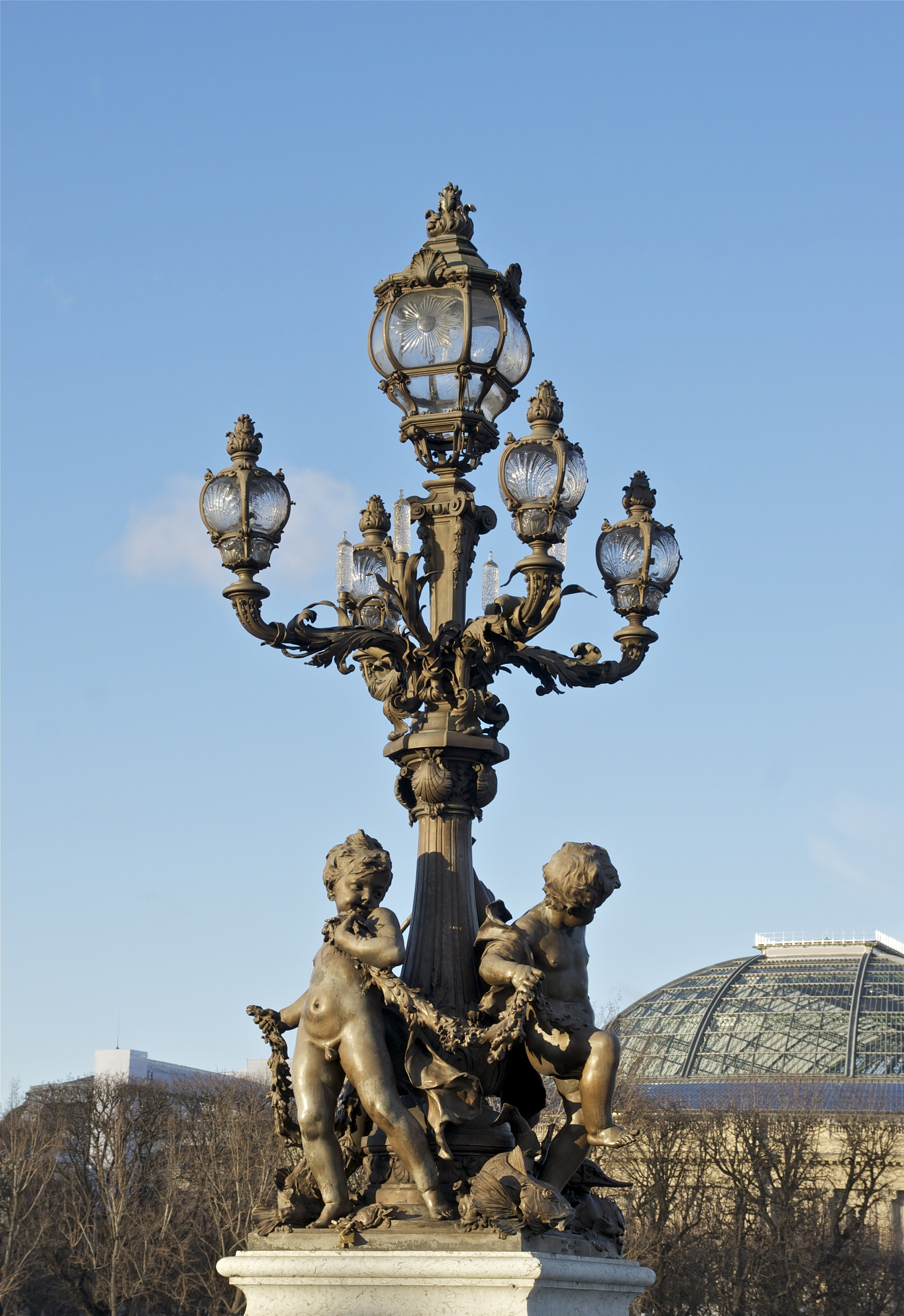
Beaux-Arts street light with putti, by Henri Désiré Gauquié, c. 1896–1900, bronze, Pont Alexandre III, Paris, France

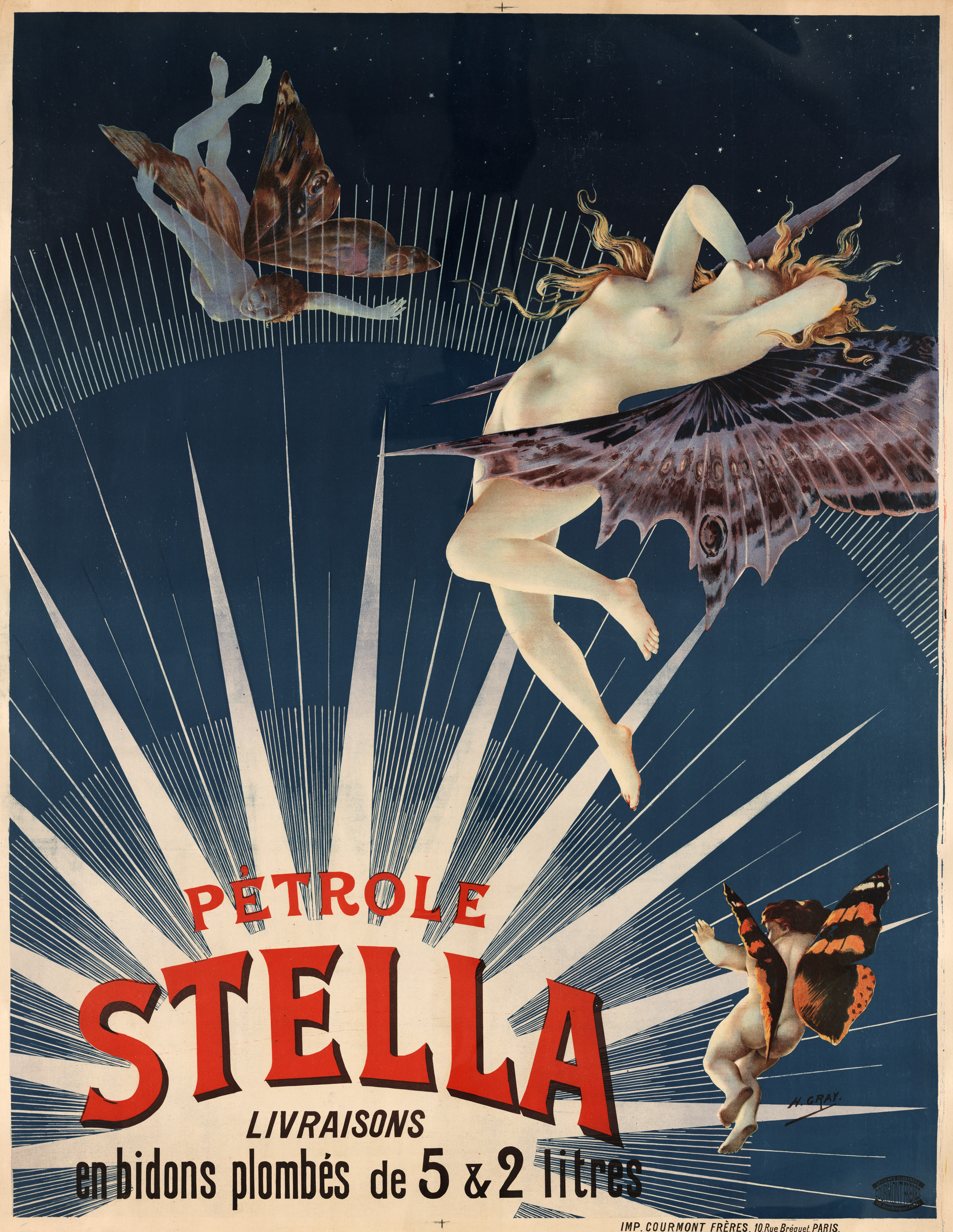
Art Nouveau putti and a nymph on an advertising poster for Pétrole Stella, by Henri Gray, 1897, coloured lithograph, Library of Congress, Washington, D.C., US

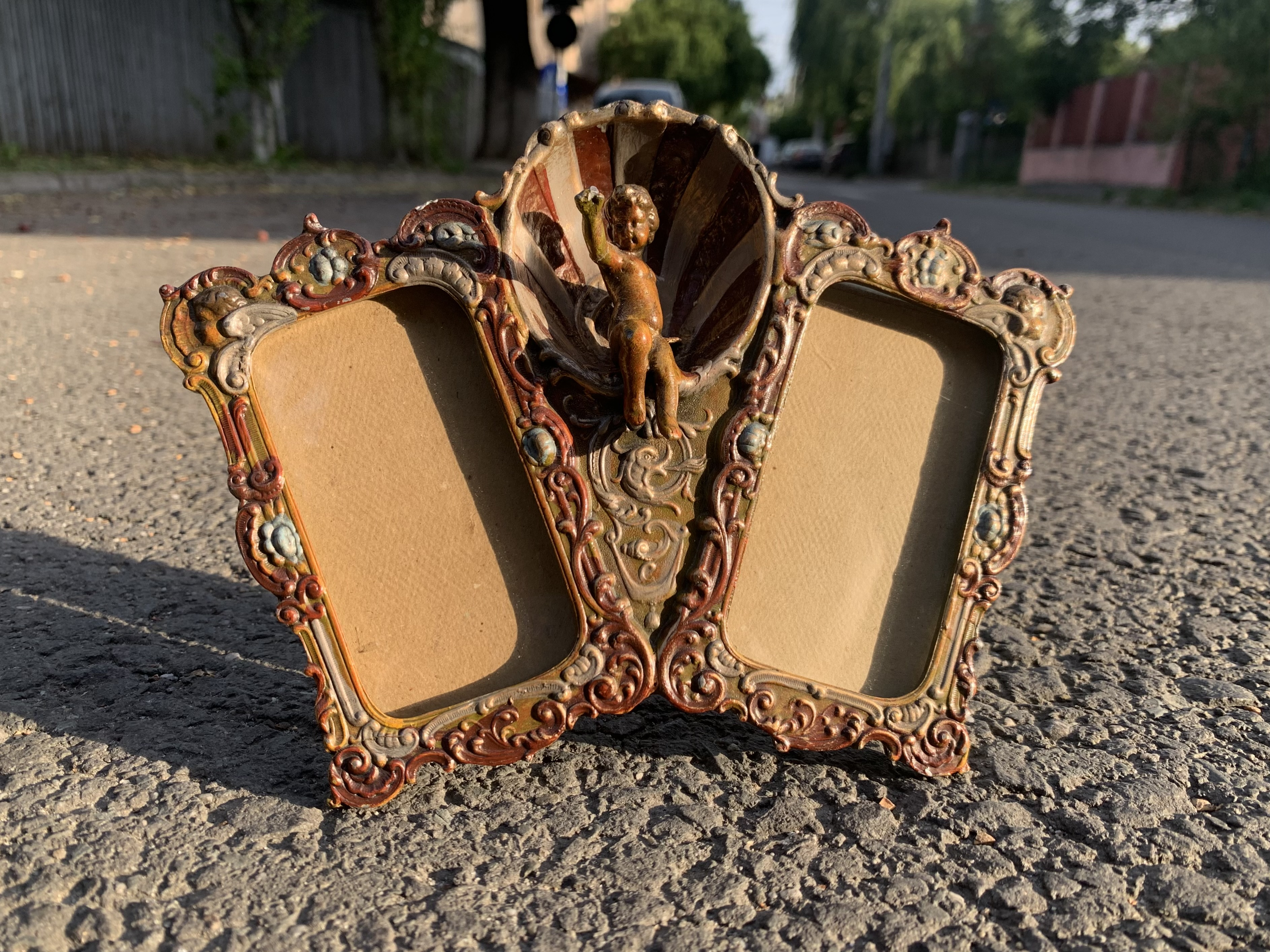
Rococo Revival polychrome frame with a putto in a round niche, unknown workshop or designer, c. 1900, painted metal, private collection

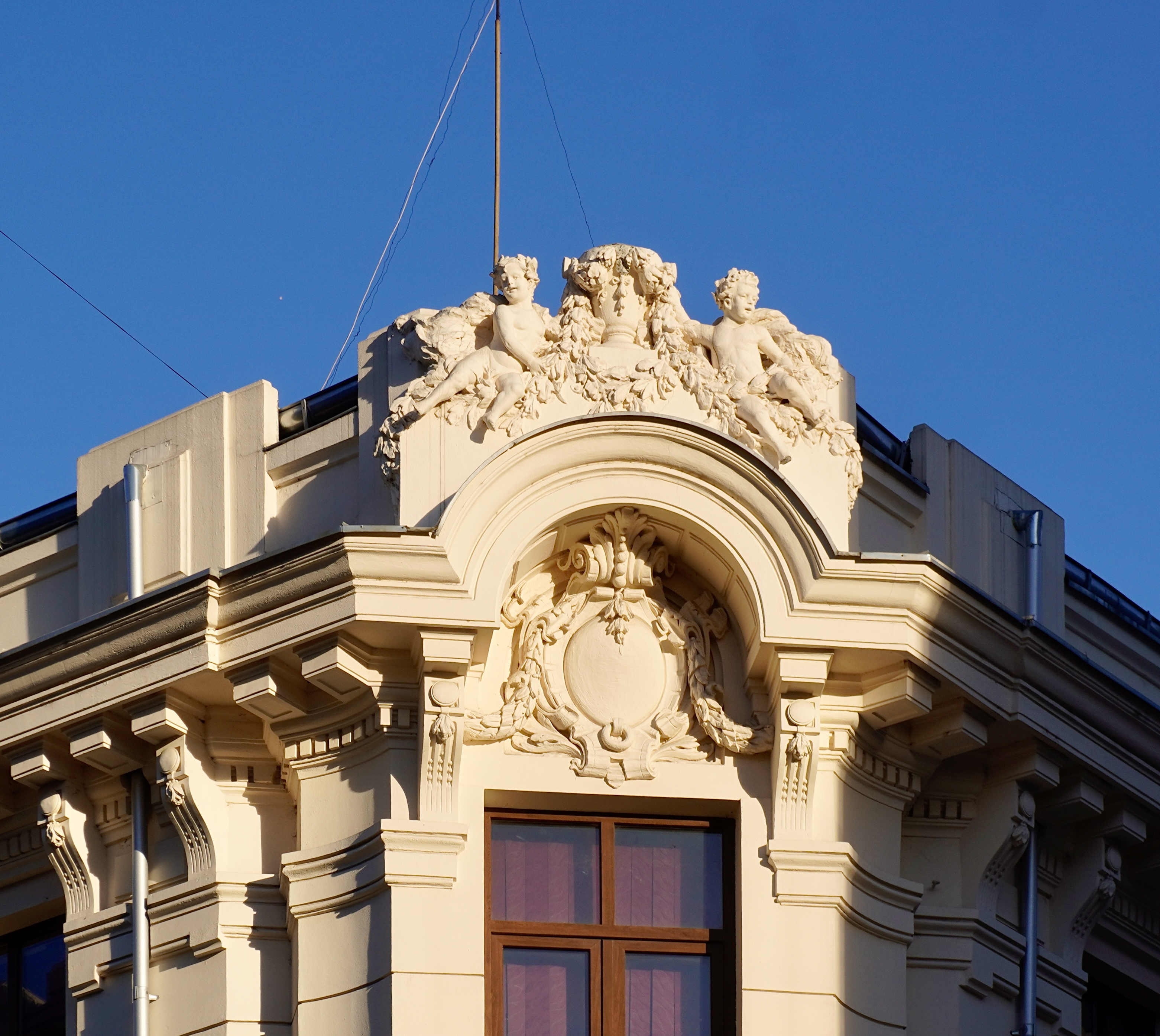
Beaux-Arts putti on Bulevardul Regina Elisabeta no. 41, Bucharest, Romania, unknown architect, c. 1900

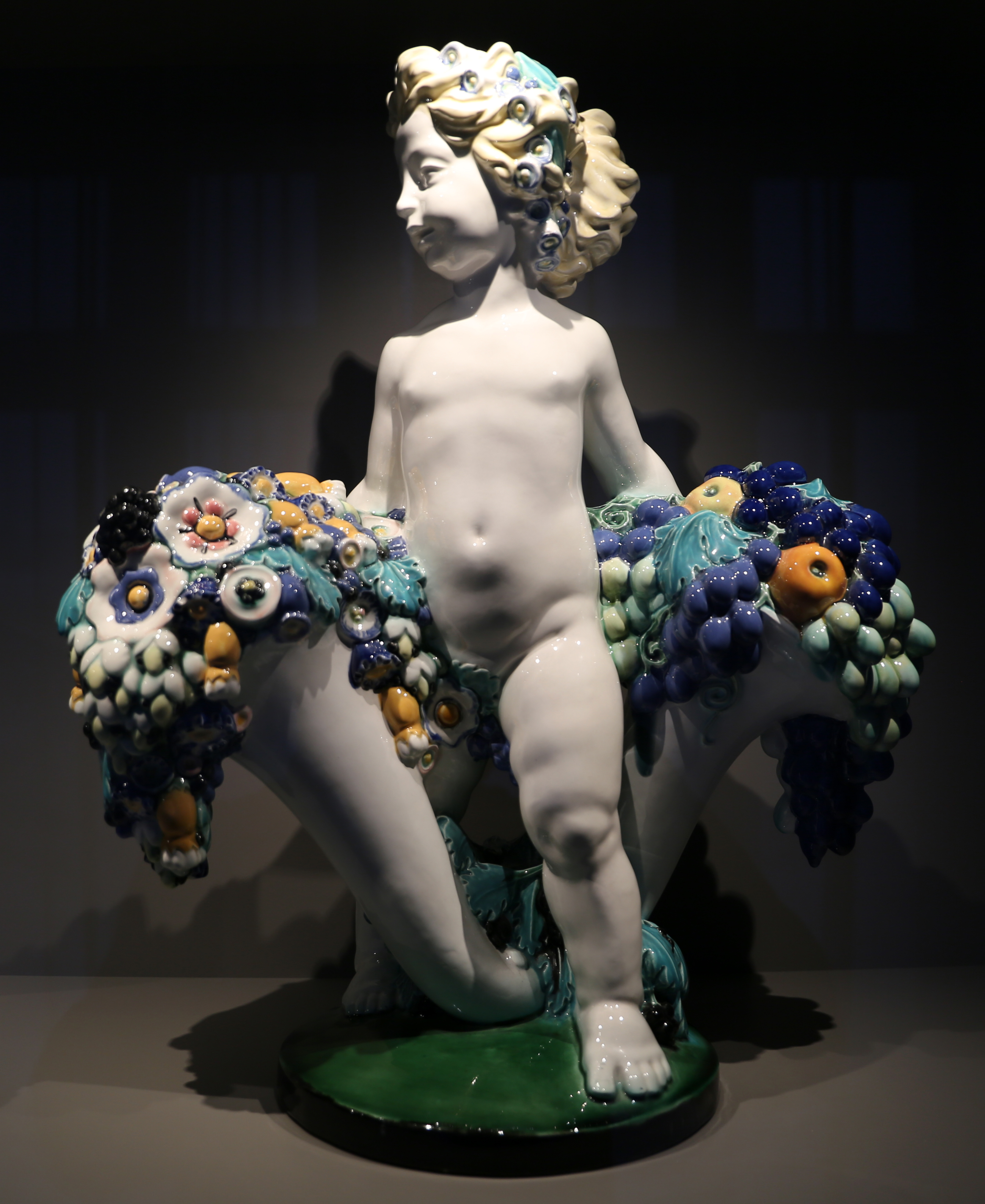
Secessionist putto with two cornucopias with floral cascades, by Michael Powolny, designed in c. 1907, produced in 1912, ceramic, Kunstgewerbemuseum Berlin

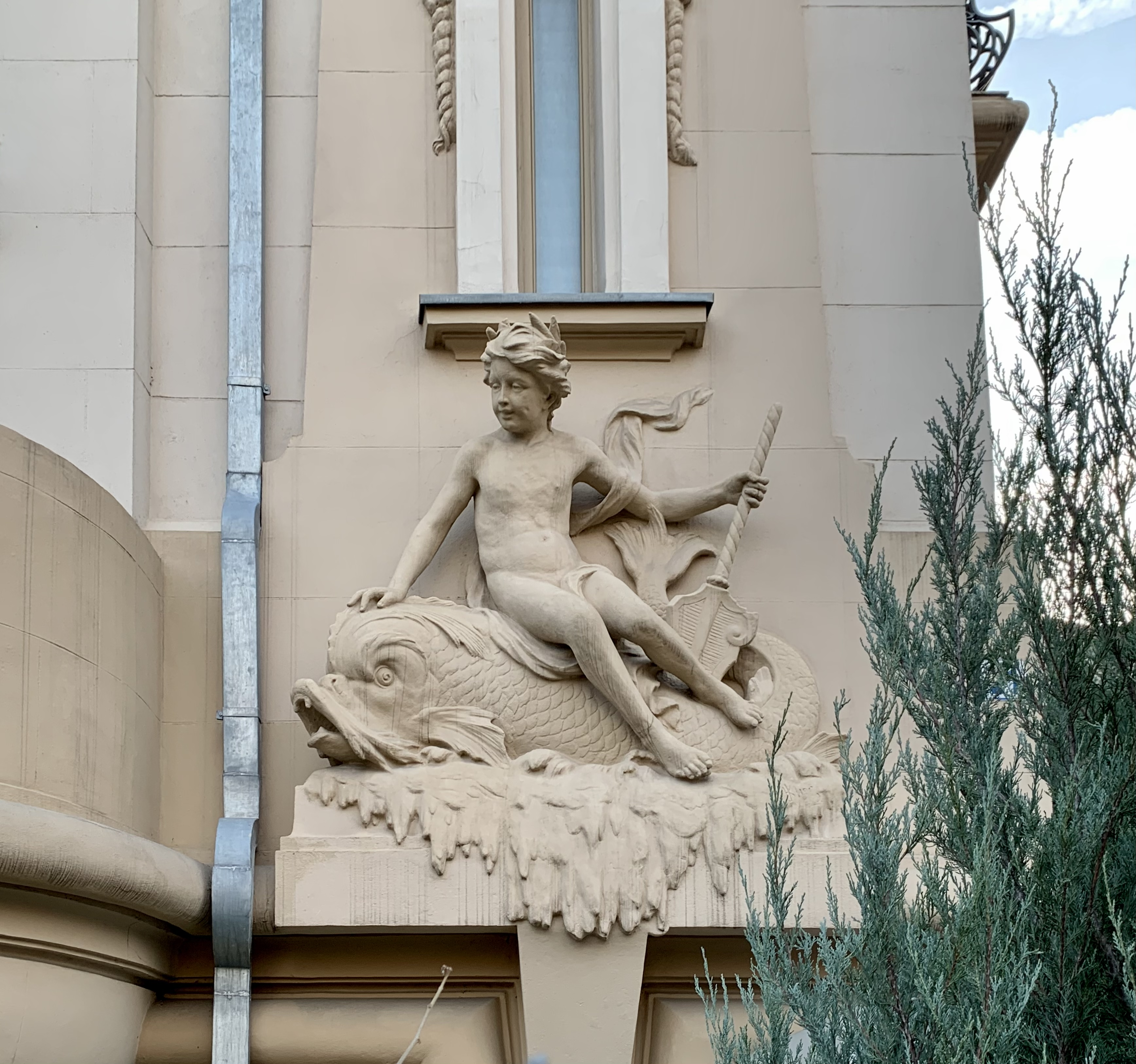
Beaux Arts putto on the Vasile Urseanu House, the current Bucharest Observatory (Bulevardul Lascăr Catargiu no. 21), Bucharest, Romania, designed by Ion D. Berindey, 1908–1910

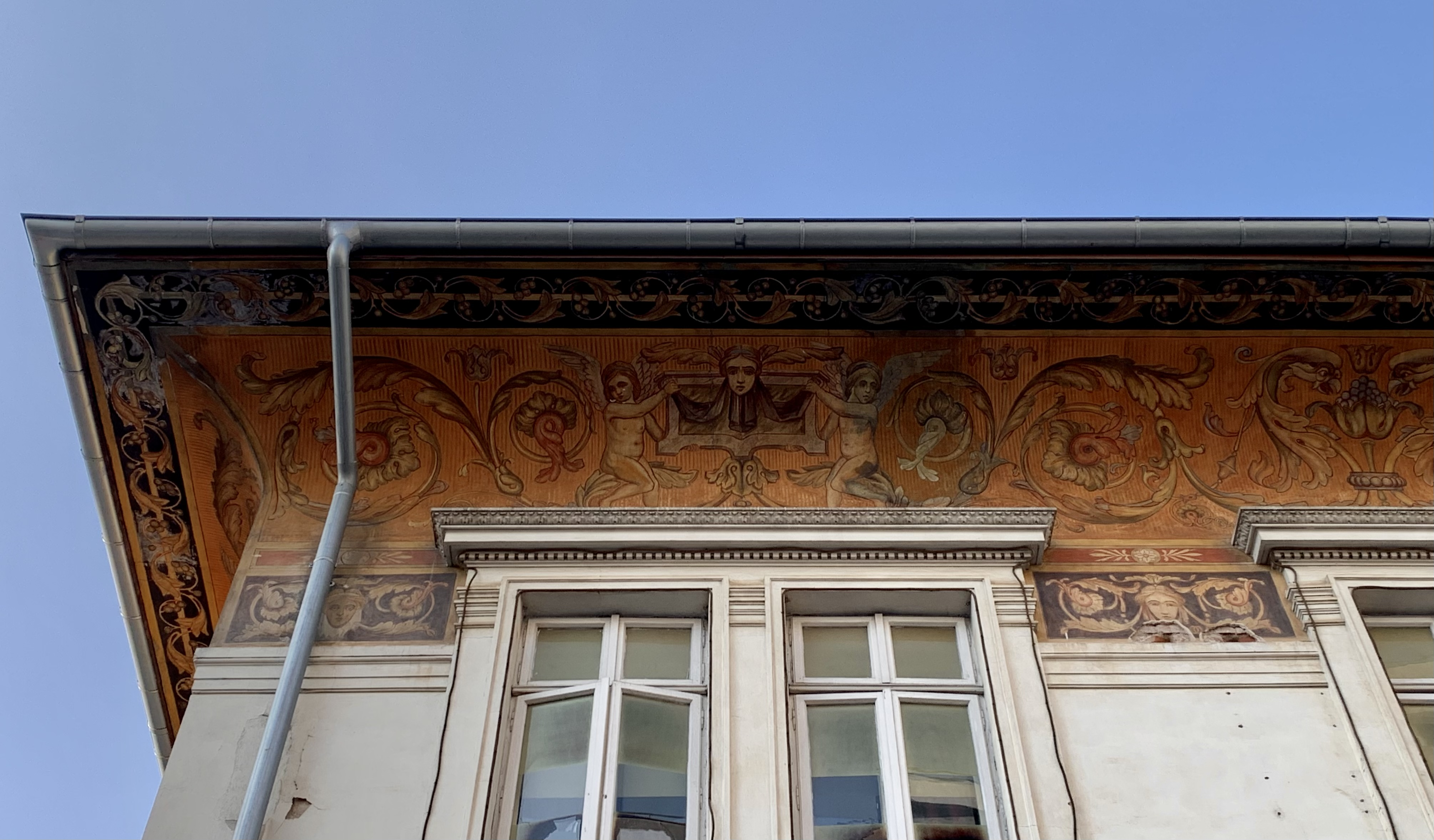
Renaissance Revival grotesque with putti on the Doctor Răuțoiu House (Strada Tache Ionescu no. 29), Bucharest, designed by Gregoire Marc and Ernest Doneaud, c. 1910

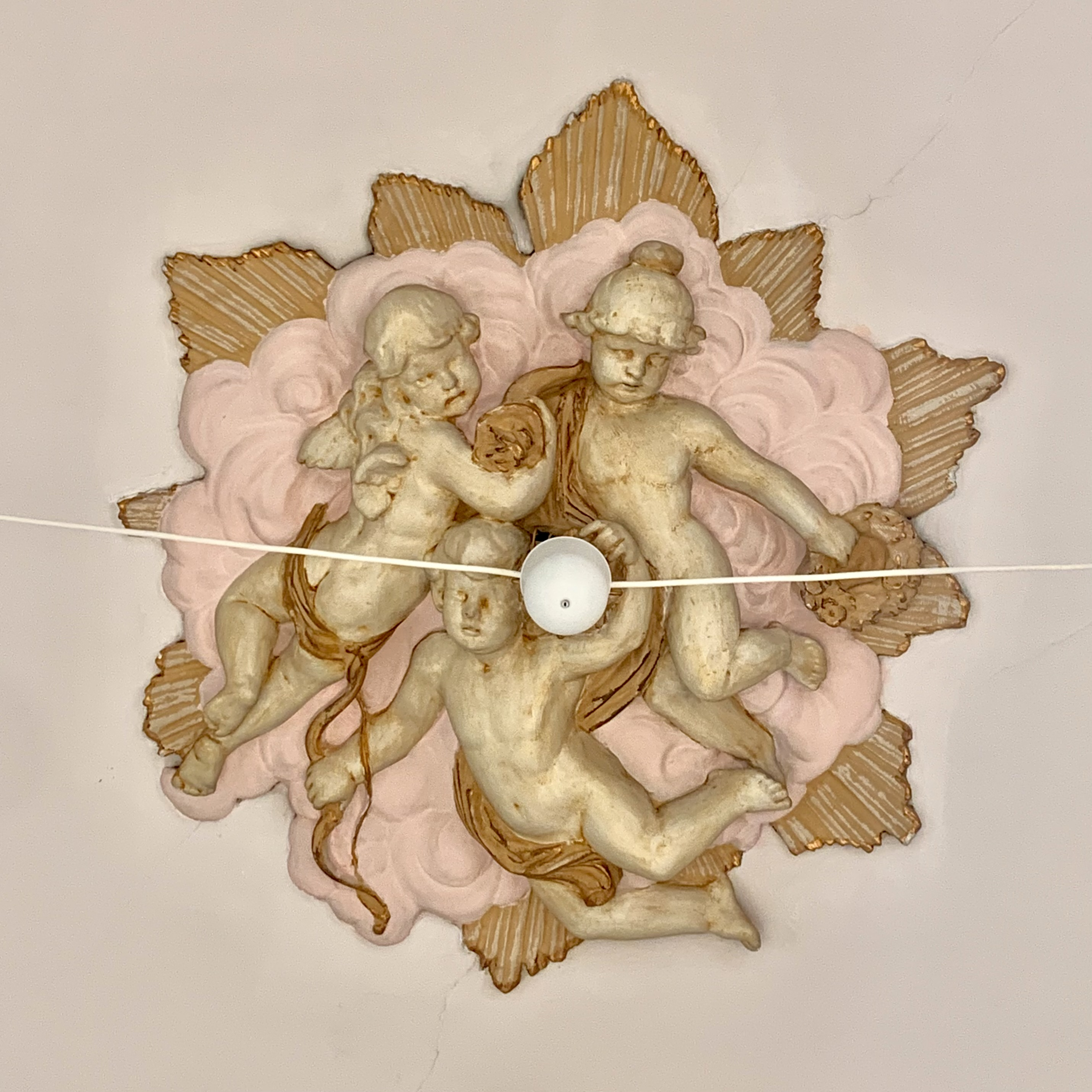
Beaux Arts stucco with putti on a ceiling in Piața Romană no. 3, Bucharest, Romania, designed by Siegfired Kofsinski and C. Crețoiu, 1912

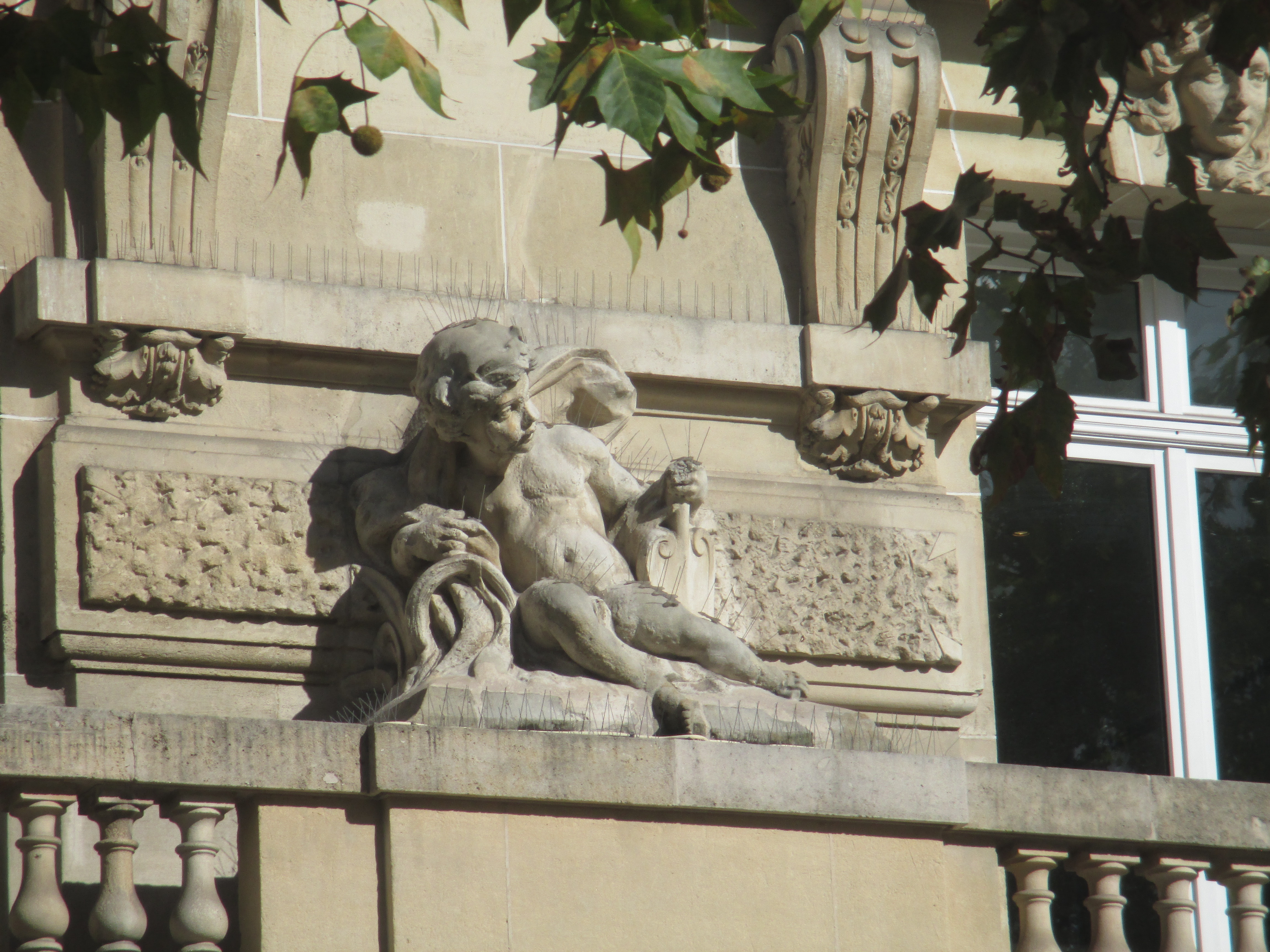
Beaux Arts putto on a balcony balustrade of the Hôtel Claridge (Avenue des Champs-Élysées no. 74), designed by Charles Lefebvre or Louis Duhayon, 1914

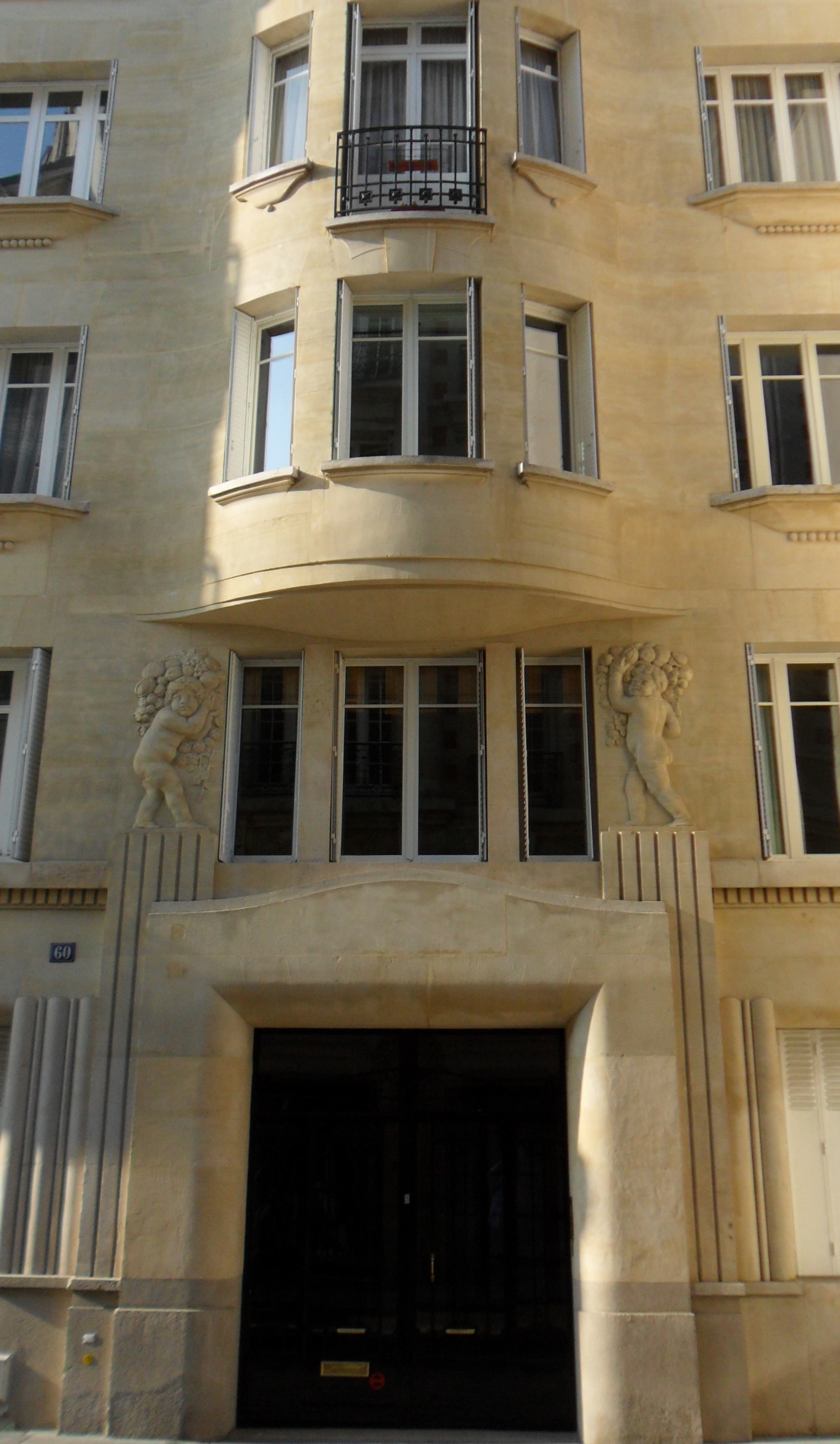
Art Deco reliefs of putti on Rue de Vaugirard no. 60, Paris, France, unknown architect, c. 1930

== See also ==
- Puer Mingens – Artistic depictions of boys urinating
- Four Kumāras – A group of semi-divine sage boys in Hinduism
- Gohō dōji – Buddhist guardian deities in the form of young boys
