= Cupid Fleeing from Slavery =

Painting by Joseph-Marie Vien

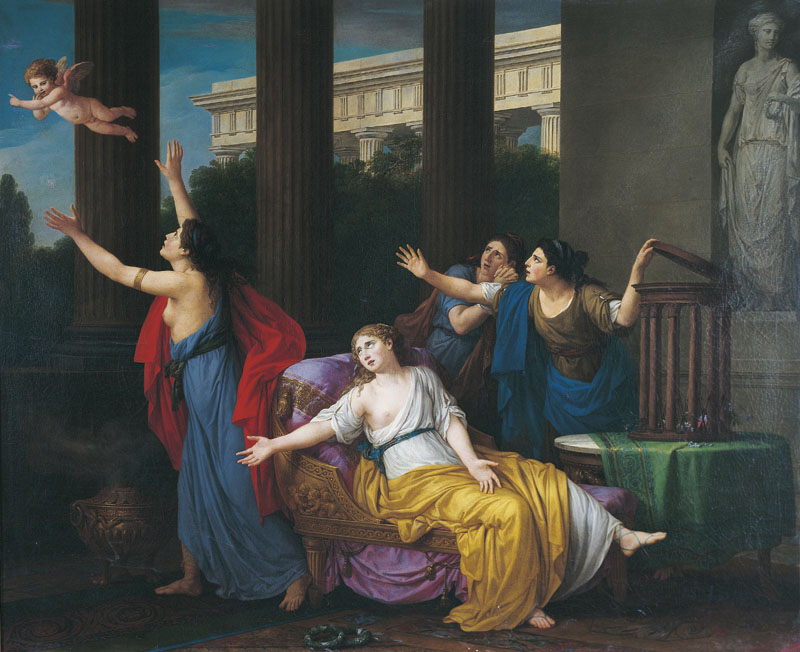
- Artist: Joseph-Marie Vien
- Year: 1789
- Type: Oil on canvas
- Dimensions: 130 cm × 160 cm (51 in × 63 in)
- Location: Musée des Augustins, Toulouse

Cupid Fleeing from Slavery is an oil on canvas painting by the French artist Joseph-Marie Vien, from 1789. In a horizontal format, it is a neoclassical mythological painting conceived as a pendant to The Cupid Seller (1763). It is held at the Musée des Augustins, in Toulouse.

== History and description ==
The composition features the figure of Cupid in flight within the upper left quadrant. He has newly escaped from a cage, the lid of which remains raised by a young woman clad in classical attire, positioned in the right third of the canvas. This escape elicits profound distress from the Roman protagonist and her three companions, all of whom gaze toward the fugitive while displaying gestures indicative of panic, most notably through their upraised arms. The scene unfolds within a palatial setting before a classical colonnade, at the base of a sculpture that occupies the upper right corner of the composition.

Commissioned by Louis Hercule Timoléon de Cossé, 8th Duke of Brissac, on behalf of his mistress, Madame du Barry, to serve as a companion piece to the aforementioned painting in her possession, the work was debuted at the Paris Salon during the year of its completion, notably serving as the inaugural entry in the exhibition catalogue. Requisitioned during the French Revolution, the artwork has been held at the Musée des Augustins, in Toulouse, since 1876. The municipality of Haute-Garonne officially acquired title to the property in 2004.

A preparatory oil sketch for this composition is preserved in the collection of the Princeton University Art Museum, in Princeton.
