= The Cupid Seller (fresco) =

Detached fresco from Villa Arianna, Stabiae, Italy

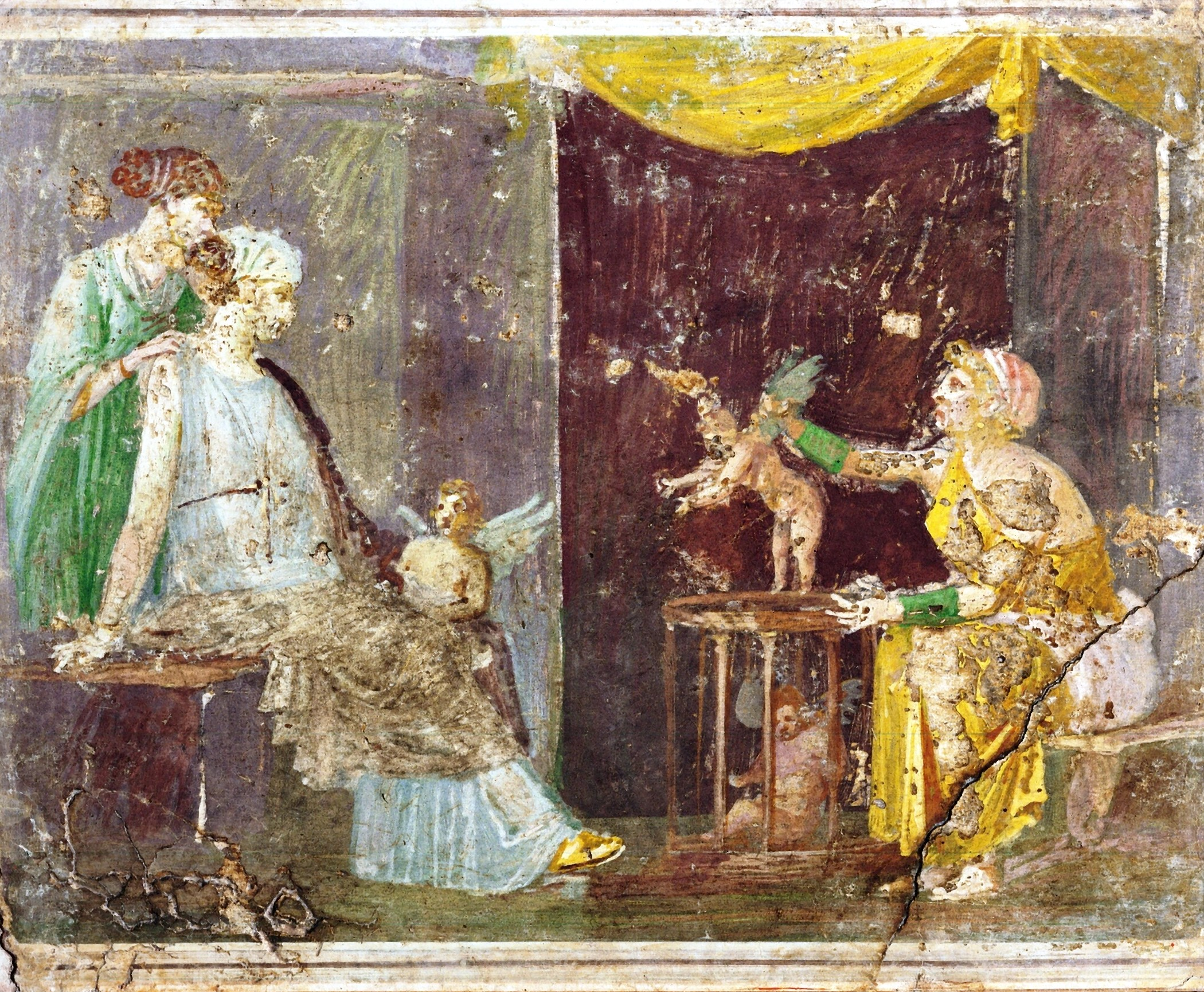
The Cupid Seller

The Cupid Seller is a 30 BC – 50 AD Roman genre fresco discovered in 1759 in Stabiae and now in the National Archaeological Museum, Naples. It shows a woman selling tiny cupids to a matrona. It was widely known and reproduced in the 18th and 19th centuries, proving a major influence on art such as Vien's The Cupid Seller.

== Discovery ==
Roman Stabiae (now Castellammare di Stabia) lay between Naples and Sorrento. Rich people of that era built luxurious villas around Stabiae as summer residences, one of the largest and oldest of which is now known as the Villa Arianna, built in the 2nd century BC. It was located on a hillside with views of the Bay of Naples and was the centre of a 14 square kilometre estate. The name of the family which owned it is unknown, but it was very wealthy, judging by the number of wall paintings.

All the villas around Stabiae were destroyed in the eruption of Mount Vesuvius in 79 AD, specifically by the lava flows. They were first excavated in 1749, with the ruins of Villa Arianna uncovered between 1757 and 1762. The Cupid Seller had broken into several pieces and formed the centre of a wall painting. With furnishings and the best wall paintings it was taken to Naples and other royal palaces and the ruins were infilled, to be re-excavated in 1950–1952.

== Description ==
It was painted on the wet plaster using the fresco technique. Like most murals from the Villa Arianna, the fresco belongs to the Third Pompeian Style. The wall is divided into different fields horizontally and vertically. A central image is surrounded by areas that are sometimes completely flat and interrupted by ornamental decorations without great spatial depth. The murals from the Villa Arianna seem not to have been made by local craftsmen and artists from the area, but by workshops in Rome.

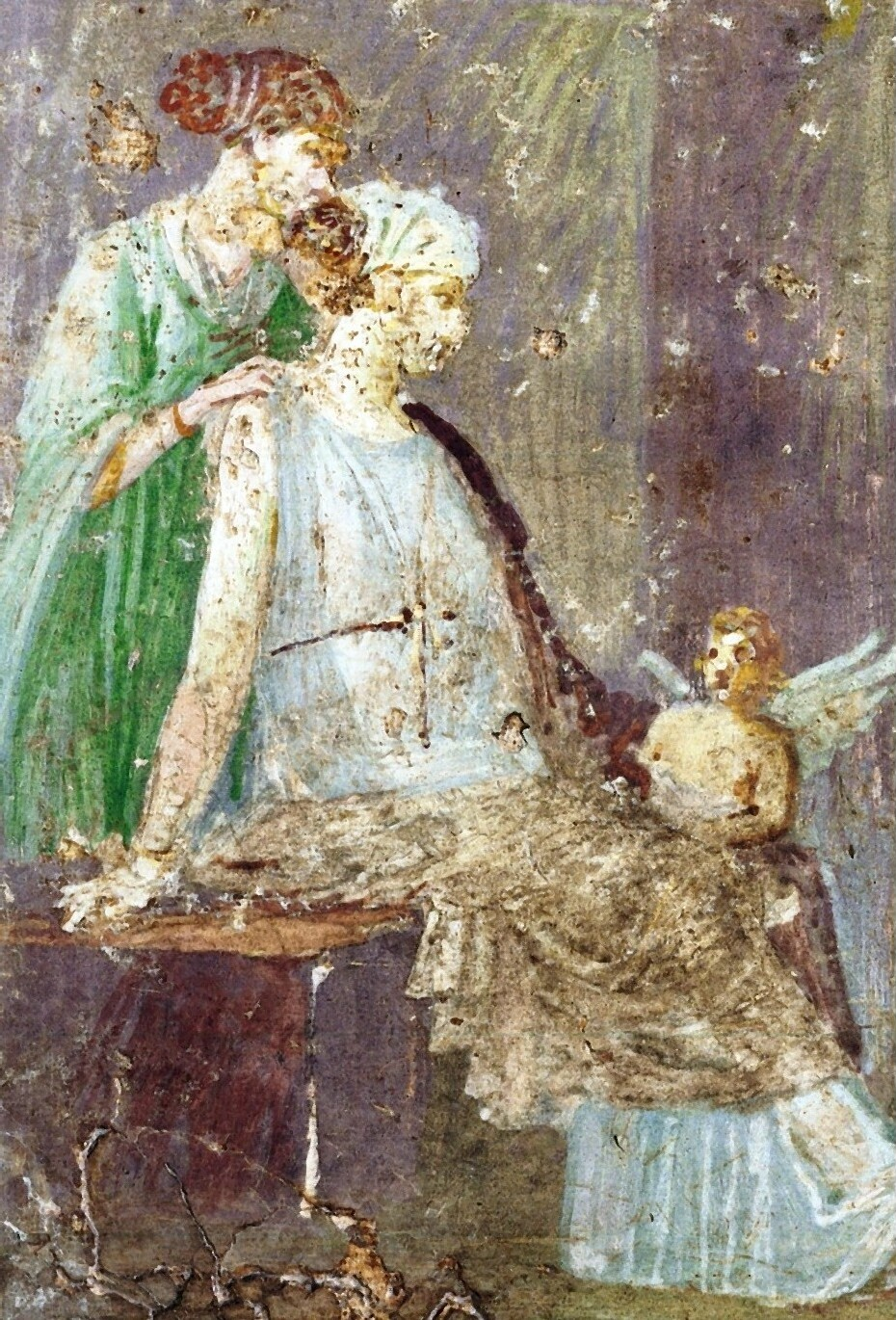
The Matrona with her confidante

The mural is divided into two zones by the background and the arrangement of the figures. The suggested architecture and seating probably represent an interior. A total of three women and three winged creatures can be seen. On the left side, a seated Roman matrona is shown with a friend or relation standing behind her with her hand on her shoulder. They both thoughtfully look at the cupids, one of whom is partially hidden behind or between the matrona's legs.

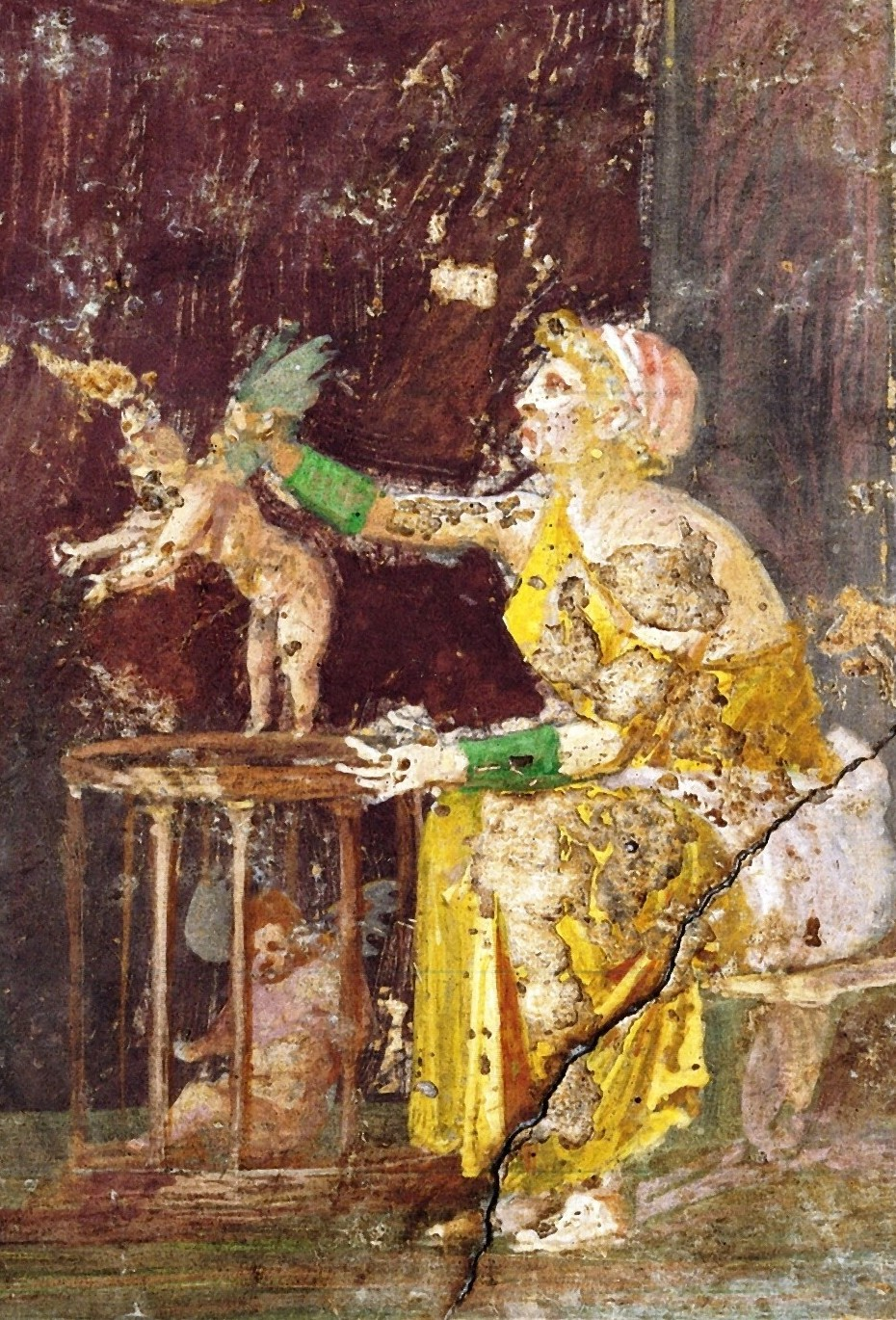
The cupid seller

On the right side, under a yellow curtain, a seller is depicted sitting on a small stool and offering her wares. She has taken a small cupid out of the cage and is now holding it by one of its wings, while another is still in the cage waiting to be shown. The two women are obviously looking through the dealer's offerings to decide on one of the small gods, while the winged creatures are impatiently waiting to go to their new mistress. Since the strap of the seller's dress has slipped over her left shoulder, she is thought to be a hetaera.

The winged childlike creatures are cupids, described in ancient Greek mythology as headstrong and trouble-making, widely shown in Hellenistic and Roman art. They are occasionally shown trapped in cages and boxes on Greek vase paintings and Roman mosaics and wall paintings, with the Stabiae version probably inspired by a play or poem popular at the time.

== Afterlife ==
Charles VII (King of Naples until 1759), took the fresco to Portici Palace. He strictly enforced a royal monopoly on excavations and severely punished illegal ones, thus trying to prevent antiquities being stolen and sold off. In 1758 he also set up a museum in the wing of his palace at Naples for all archaeological finds from around Vesuvius, but only selected visitors were given tours of it by prior appointment, and visitors were not allowed to make notes or drawings during their tours—Johann Joachim Winckelmann complained about these restrictions.

Even so, Charles VII was interested in researching and cataloguing the antiquities and so commissioned a comprehensive catalogue of them in 1759. Only completed in 1792, stretching to eight volumes with several illustrations and only published in a very small edition intended as exclusive gifts for a small circle of buyers in European courts, it was entitled Le antichità di Ercolano esposte (The Antiquity of Herculaneum Exhibited). The Cupid Seller appeared in volume 3, which was published in 1762. It was shown in a copperplate engraving by Giovanni Elia Morghen after a drawing by Carlo Nolli, reproducing the fresco almost exactly, and the text interpreted it as a scene of goddesses.

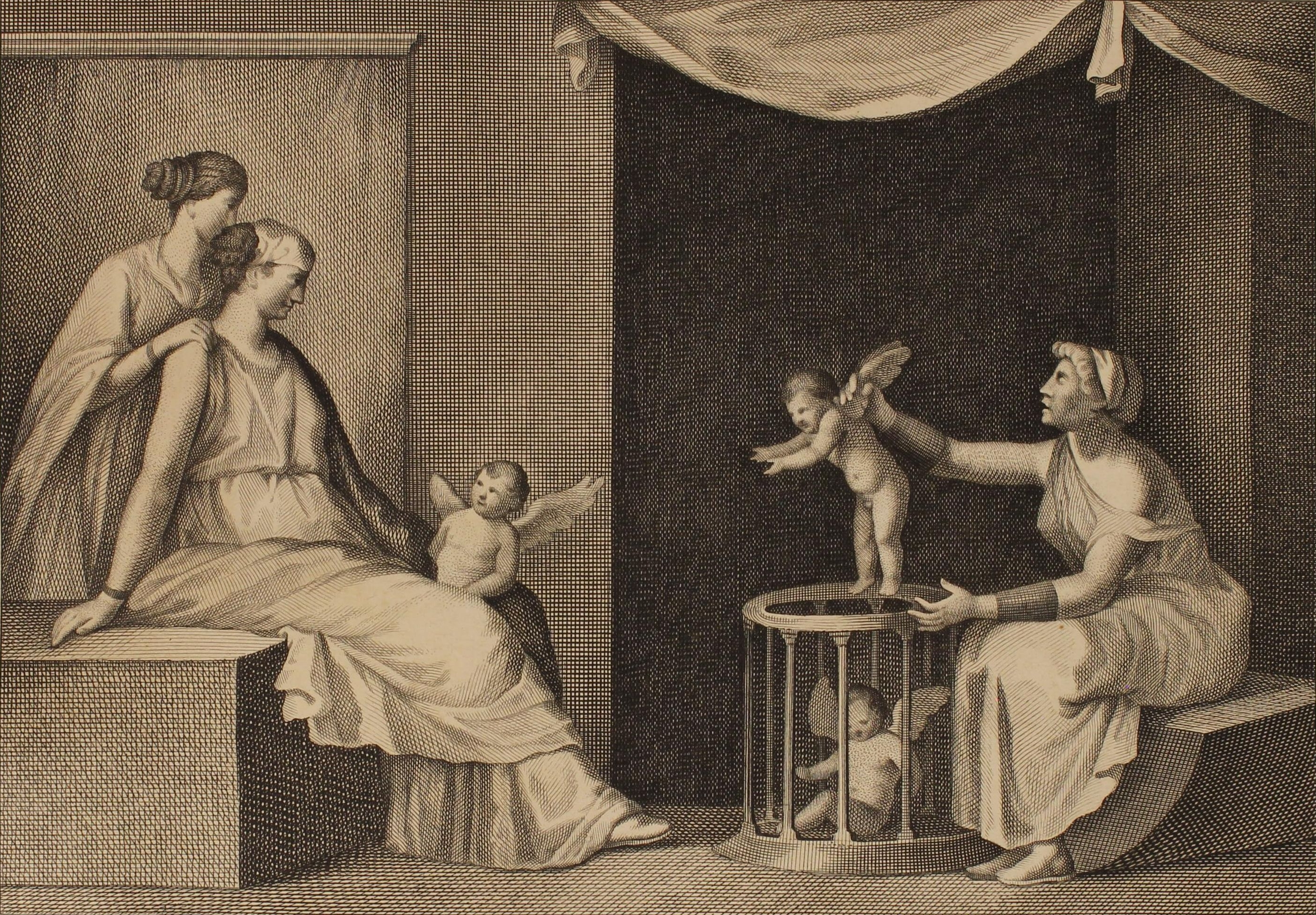
Copperplate by Giovanni Elia Morghen after a drawing by Carlo Nolli (1762)

Despite the initially exclusive audience for the volumes, knowledge of the antiquities spread independently beyond owners of the volumes. Numerous copies of the copperplate illustrations were made and circulated, inspiring artists across Europe. The Cupid Seller in particular proved so successful over the decades that Villa Arianna was often instead known as the Villa of the Cupid Seller.

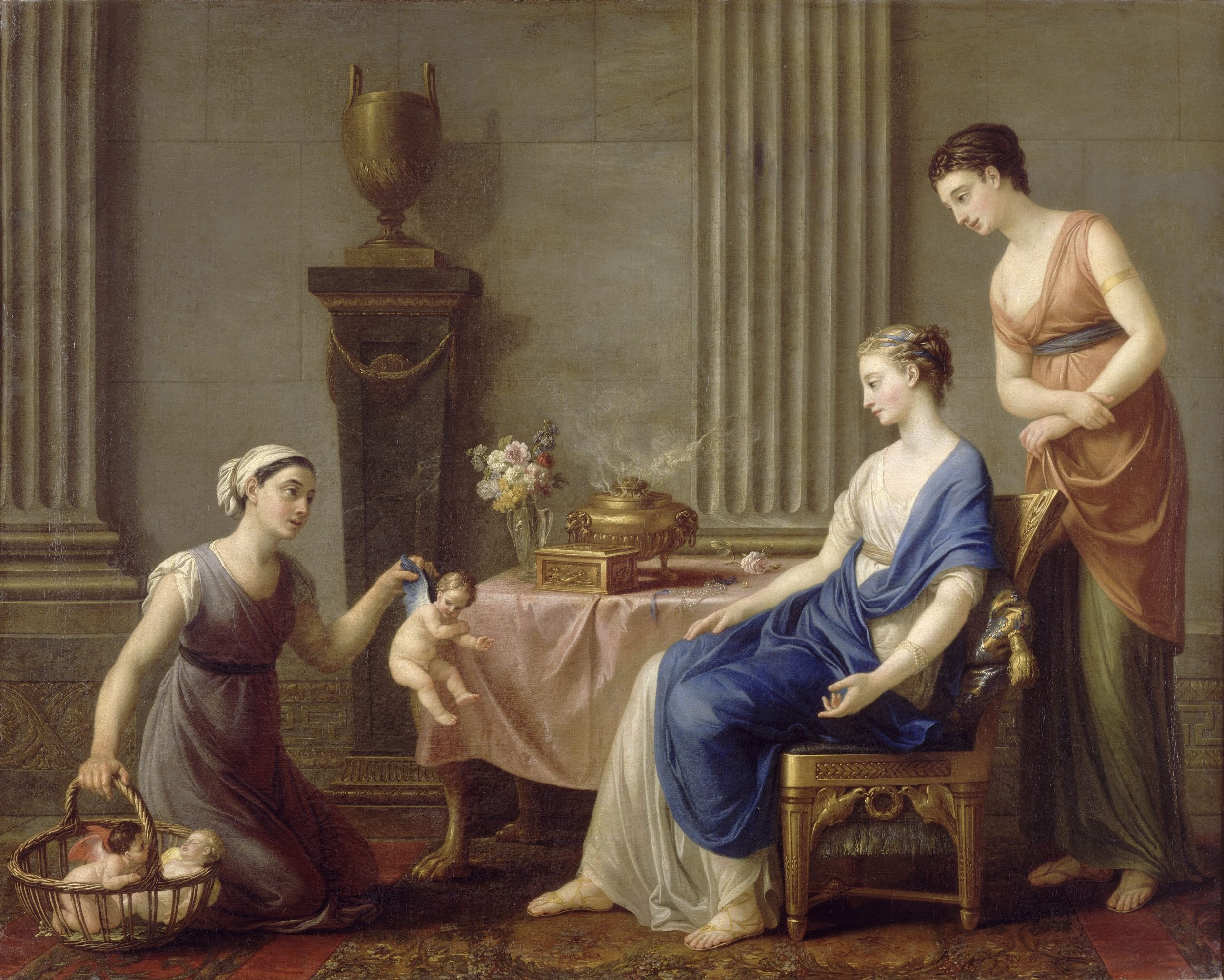
Joseph-Marie Vien: The Cupid Seller (1763)

Joseph-Marie Vien's 1762 painting after the fresco was one of the earliest works inspired by it and one of the first works of neoclassicism, showing a mirror-image version of it in late rococo costumes and an interior of that period.

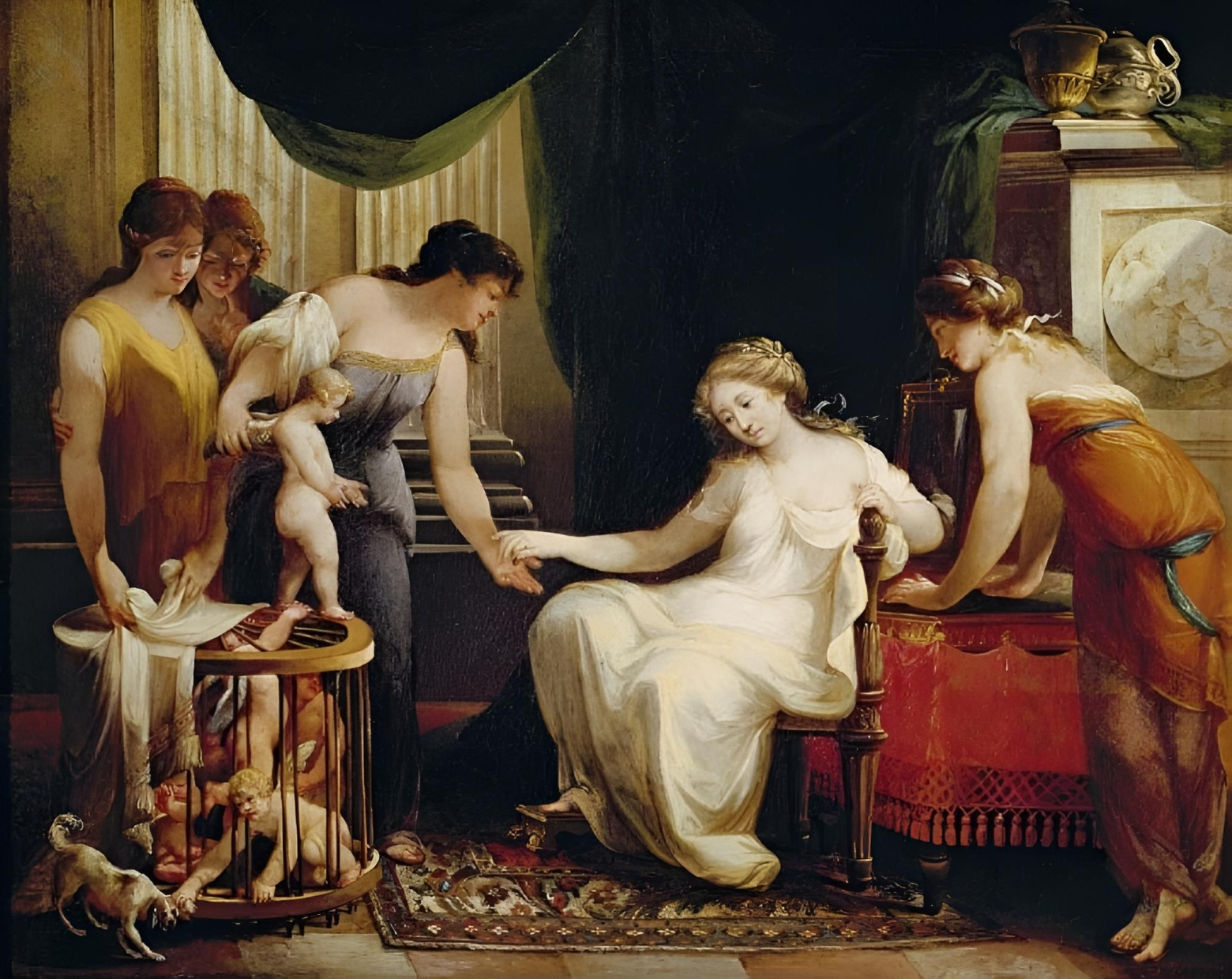
Jacques Gamelin: The Cupid Seller (1765)

Three years later, Vien's pupil Jacques Gamelin also treated the subject, borrowing his fluted pilasters but also modifying it even more by adding two more women and (uniquely) showing the matrona handing the trader some coins.

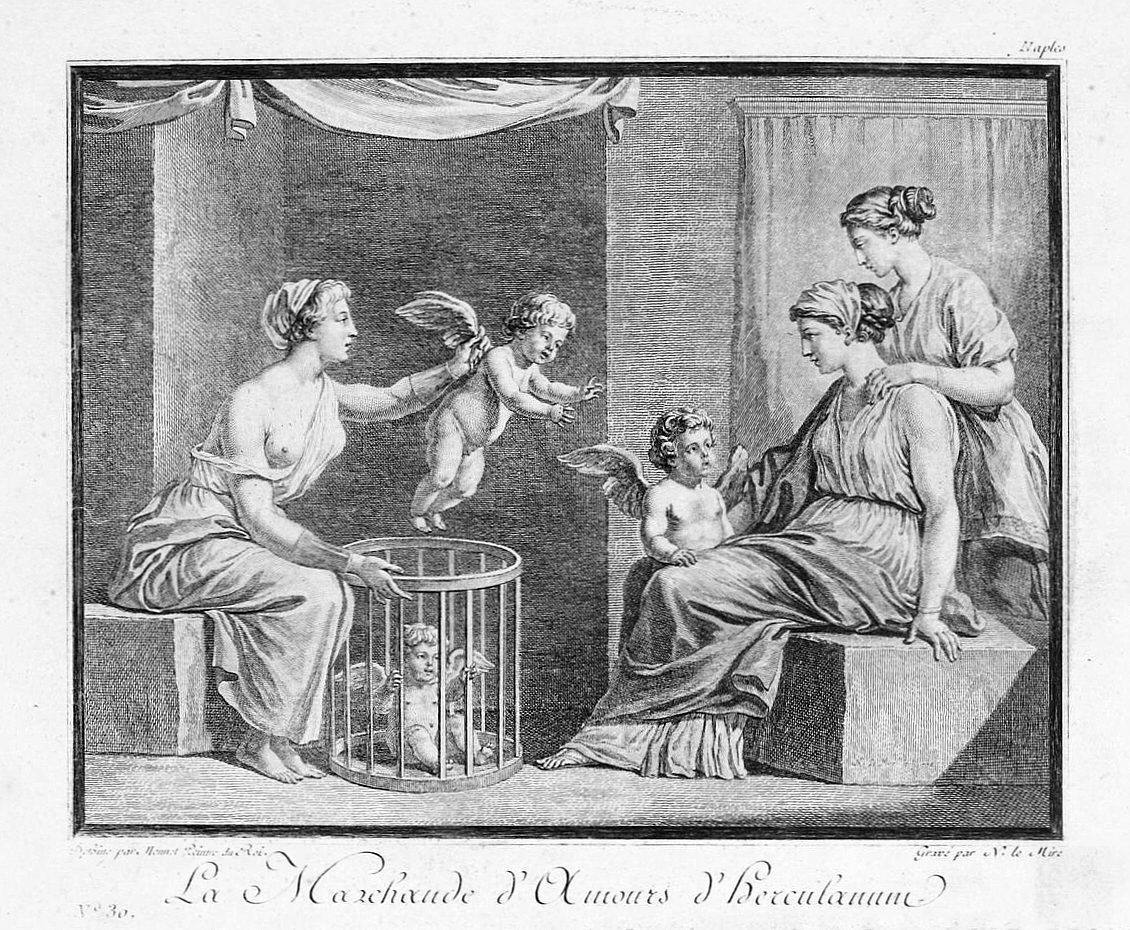
Noël Lemire: The Cupid Seller of Herculaneum [sic] (1782)

Another of Vien's students, Jacques Louis David, produced a mirror-image drawing of the original fresco whilst in Rome in 1776. Noël Lemire used that drawing as the basis for a copperplate engraving which appeared in Jean Claude Richard de Saint-Non's two-volume 1782 Voyage pittoresque ou description des Royaumes de Naples et de Sicile (A Picturesque Journey or Description of the Kingdoms of Naples and Sicily). In that work the copperplate is entitled The Cupid Seller of Herculaneum, showing that the fresco's actual findsite had already been forgotten. David and Lemire were largely faithful to the original fresco, but the figures are closer to each other, and the seller lasciviously shows her breasts, whilst the sharp contours and dark shadows match contemporary French taste.

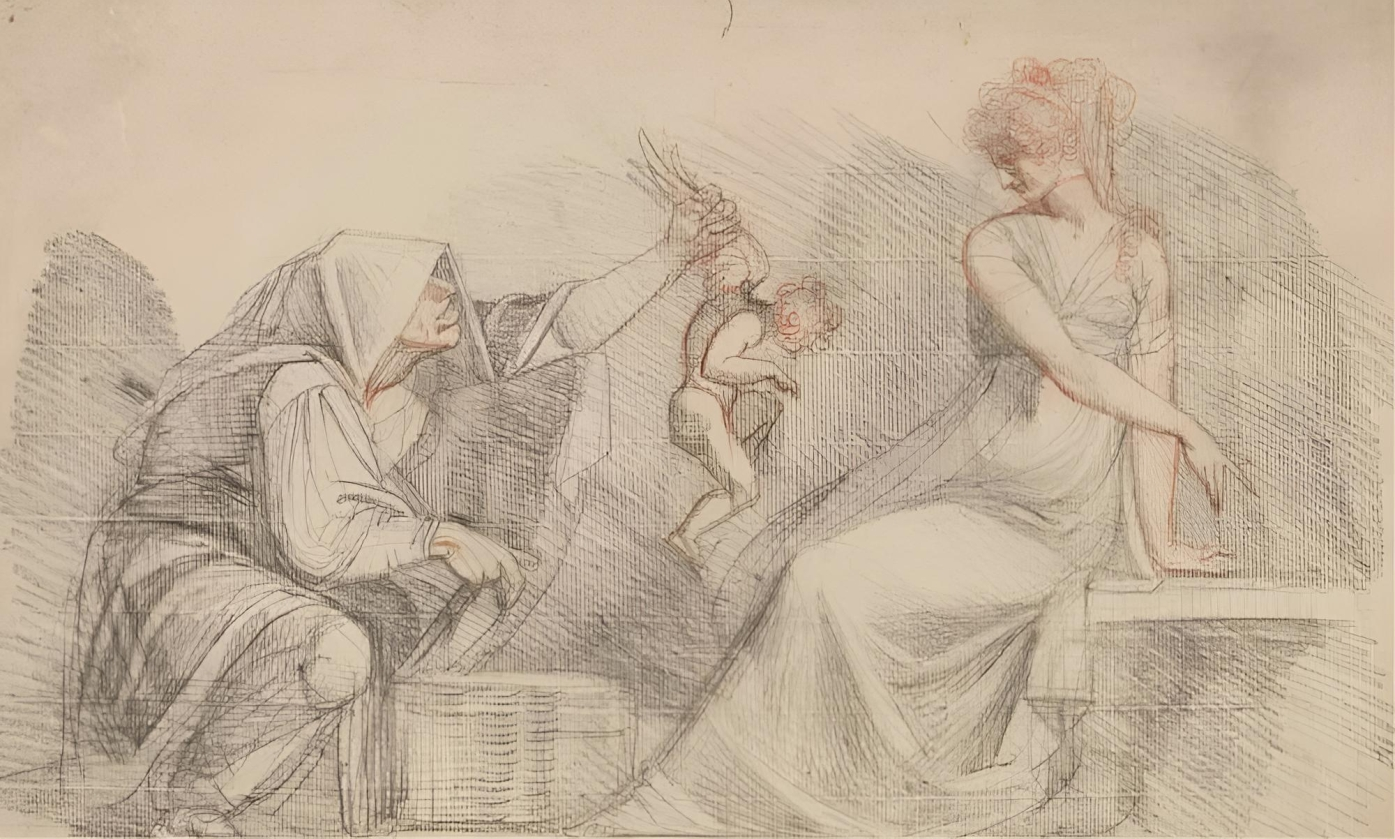
Johann Heinrich Füssli: The Cupid Seller (1775/1776)

The most unusual interpretation of the fresco is by Johann Heinrich Füssli, who possibly saw the original on a trip to Naples in 1775, produced a chalk drawing making its underlying sinister themes more explicit. He reduced it to three figures, showing the seller like a witch and a single cupid like a demon, with the buyer turning away but simultaneously repulsed and fascinated by the latter, pointing to the chair. Thus, compared to the cheerfully erotic original, female desire is shown as threatening and dangerous.

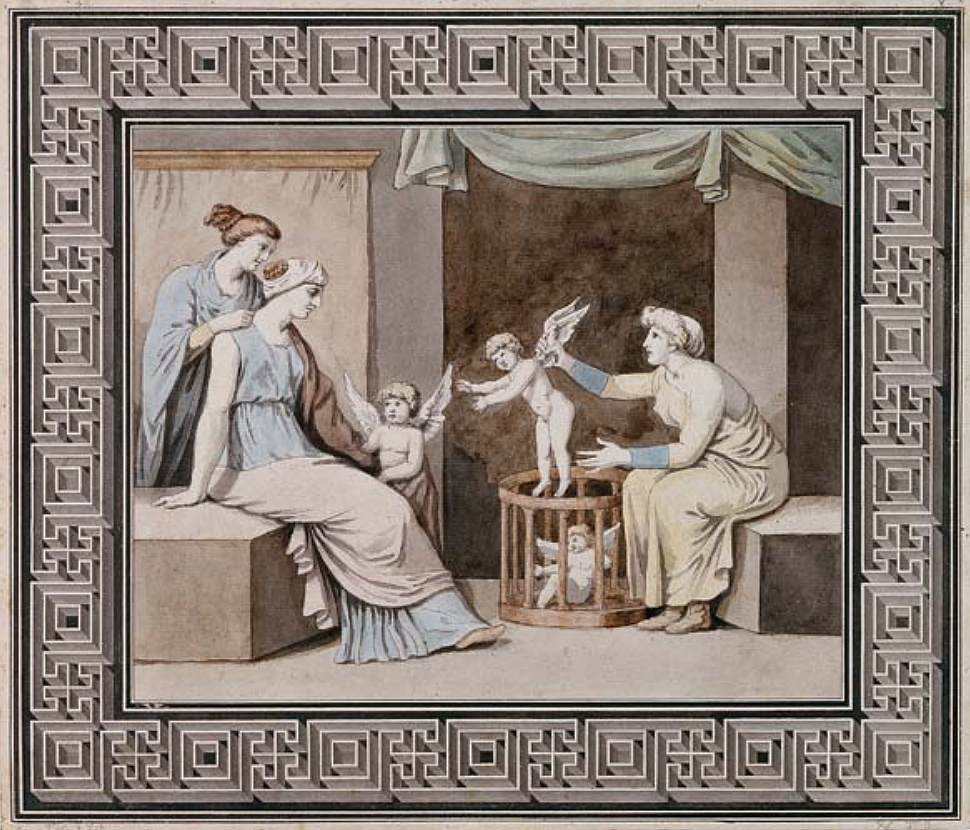
Johann Heinrich Wilhelm Tischbein: The Cupid Seller

Johann Heinrich Wilhelm Tischbein was one of the few artists who intensively worked on ancient art, producing a study of Seller in pen, ink and watercolour, emphasising its graphic qualities but toning down its bright colours. Like his contemporaries, he had perhaps imagined ancient paintings to be monochrome or subtly coloured and was therefore irritated by the original of Seller, though he still seems to have valued it as he carefully designed his drawing within a meander border.

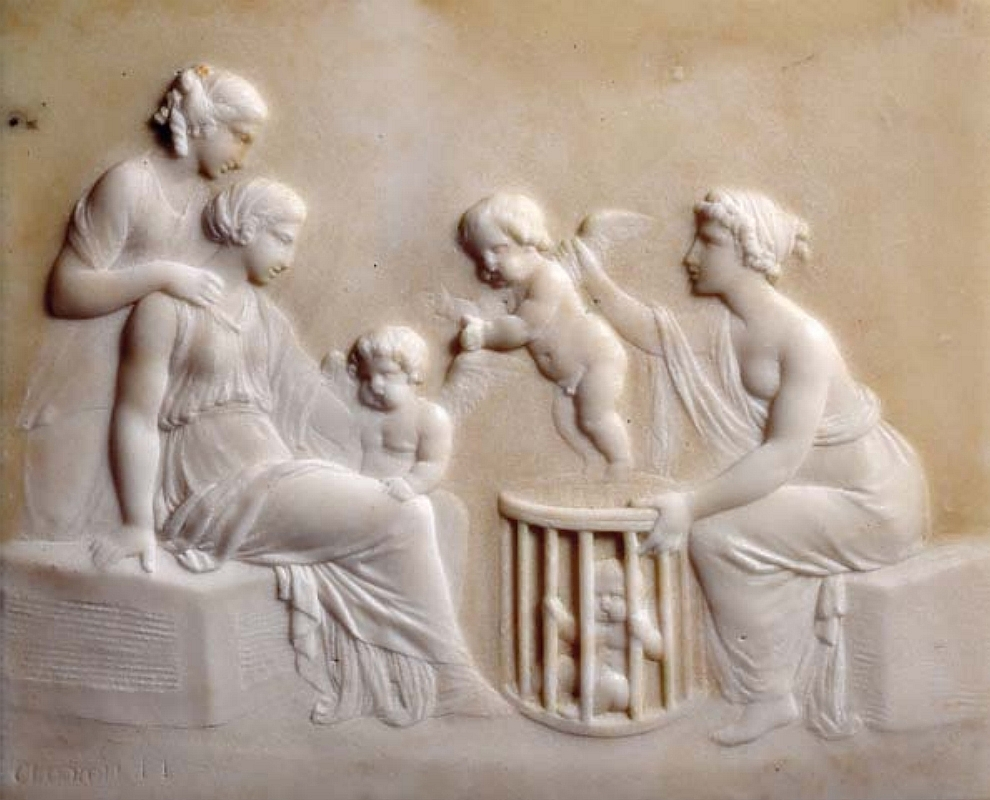
Marble relief by Clodion (1773)

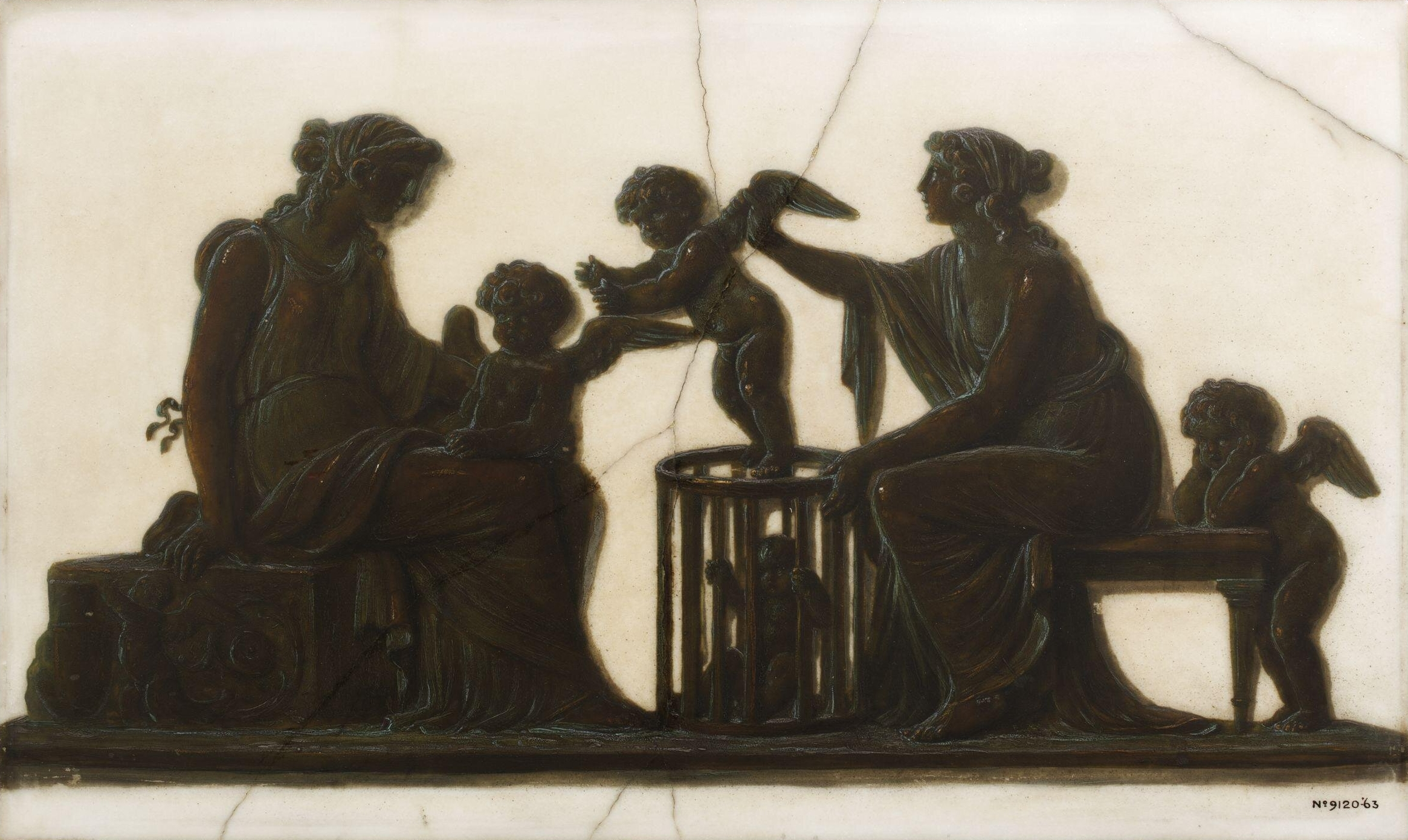
Oil painting on marble by Piat Joseph Sauvage (1799)

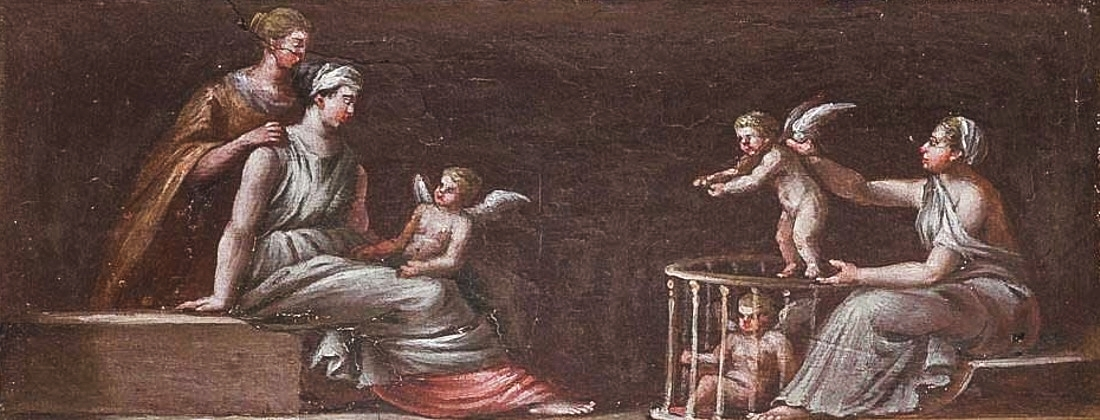
Painting in the Schloss Wörlitz

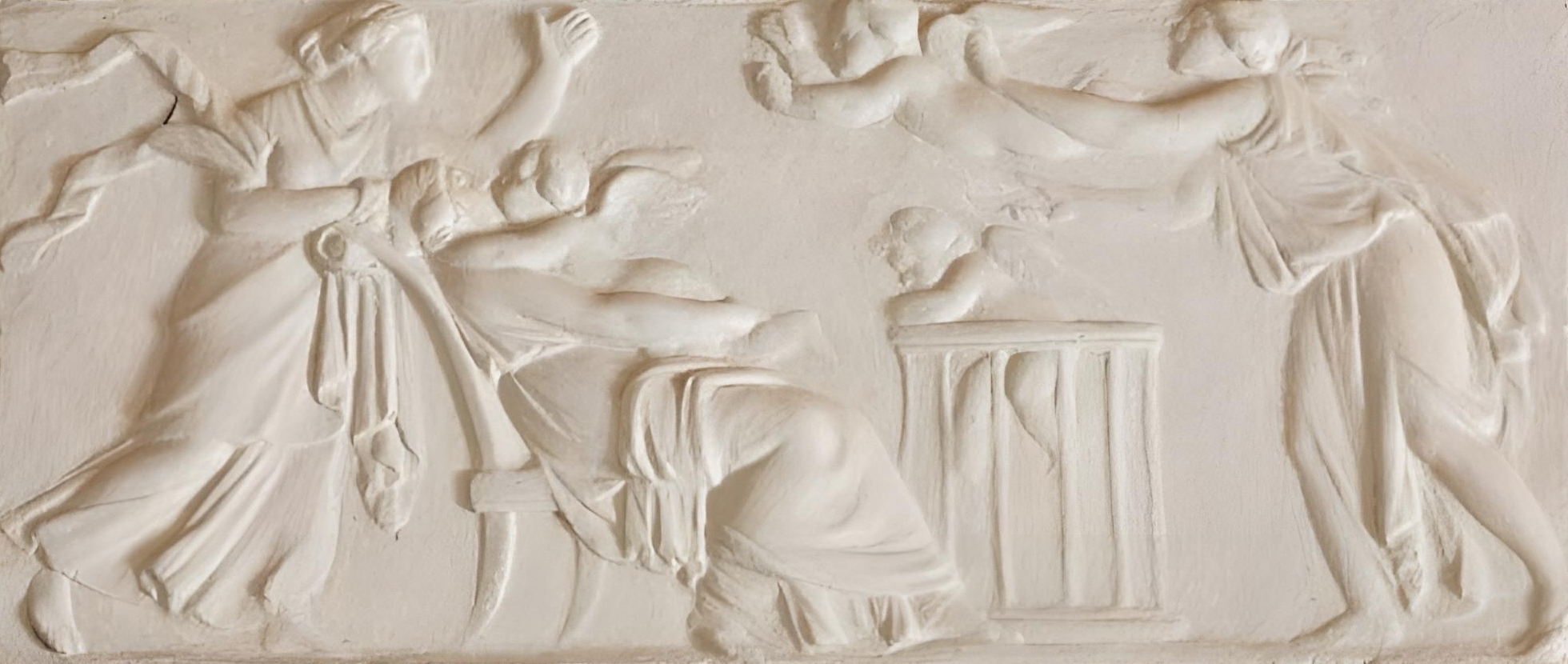
Plaster relief in the Villa Hamilton

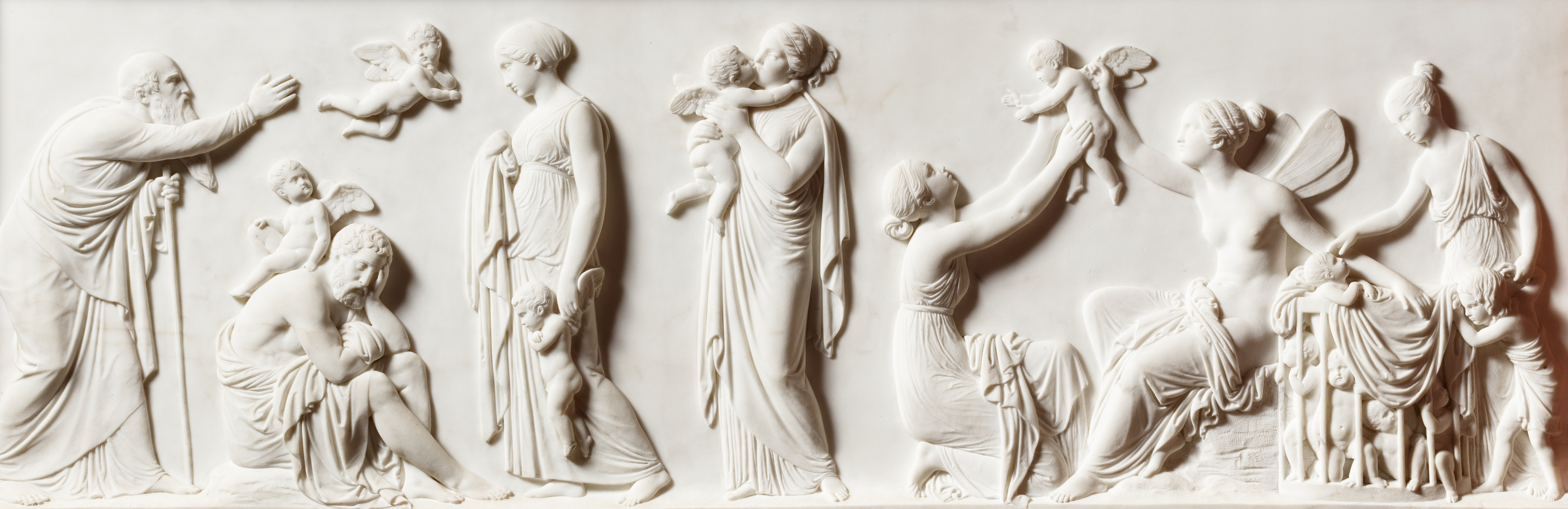
Marble frieze by Bertel Thorvaldsen (1824)

In 1773 sculptor Claude Michel exhibited a new version of the fresco at the Paris Salon as a white marble relief. He also produced further versions in marble and terracotta, which may in turn have served as models. Predominant artistic thinking of the time may have considered that a marble version better reflected the artistic greatness of antiquity than a fresco. In 1799, influenced by the reliefs, Piat Joseph Sauvage produced a mixed-media version in dark oils on white marble, a pseudo-relief style popular around 1800.

In late 18th century Britain it became popular to decorate whole rooms in the Pompeian style, a popularity which later spread to German-speaking countries. One of the earliest such interiors is at the Schloss Wörlitz, whose walls and ceilings are based on the engravings from Le antichità di Ercolano esposte. They feature two versions of The Cupid Seller. One based on Nolli's engraving is in the bedroom of the former mistress of the house, Princess Luise (the original fresco was also in a bedroom), whilst a freely-adapted stucco relief version decorates a wall in the fireplace room in the Villa Hamilton, an outbuilding in the Schloss park. In the latter, the first cupid climbs out of his cage, the second is caught in flight by the trader, and the third hangs around the buyer's neck, kissing her.

The fresco also inspired Bertel Thorvaldsen's 1824 marble frieze The Cupid Sellers. It turns the trader into a winged benefactor bestowing the joys of love on people of different ages, encompassing curiosity, longing and fulfillment, responsibility, weariness and renunciation, represented allegorically by individual figures and groups. Thorvaldsen's version was very popular and was translated into various versions and taken up by other artists.

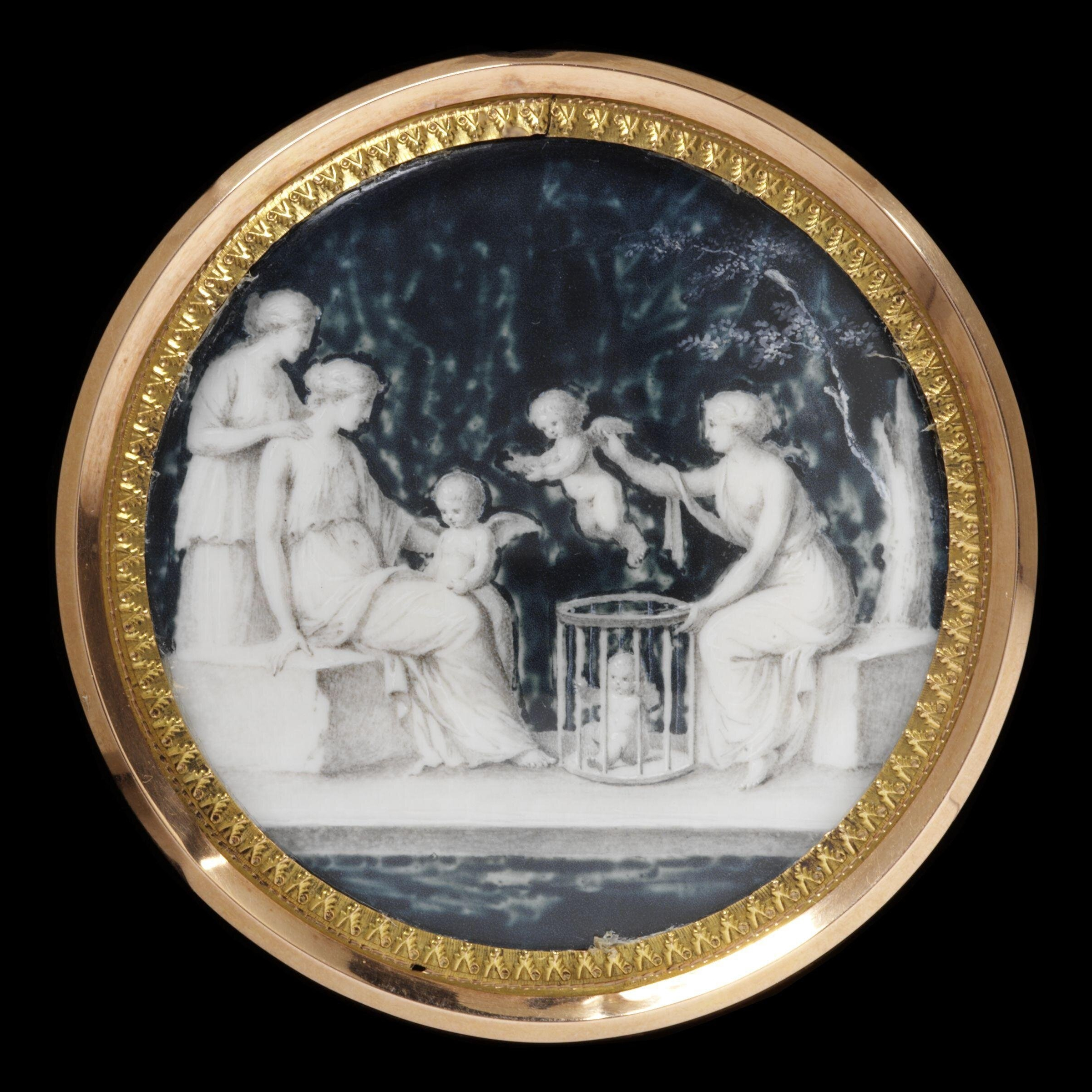
Snuff box made of gold-covered ivory behind glass (1789)

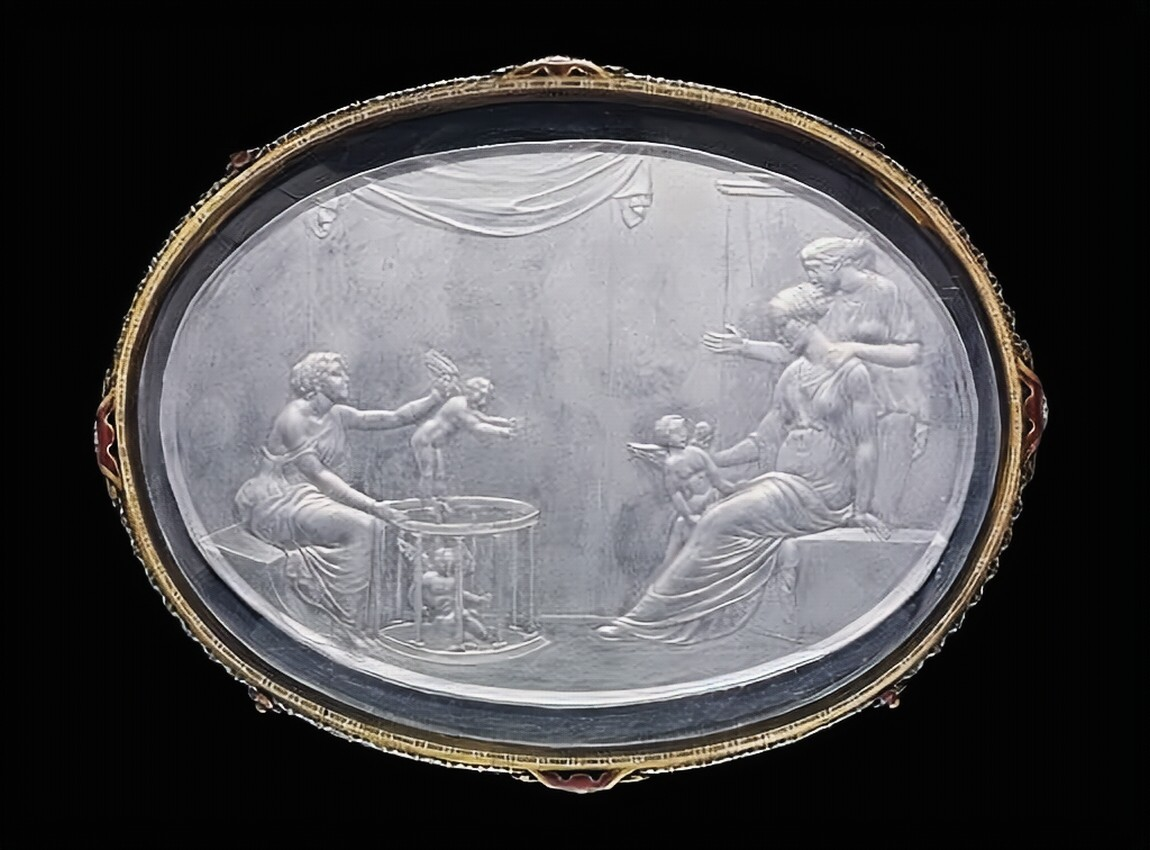
Enamel and rock crystal plaque (c. 1800)

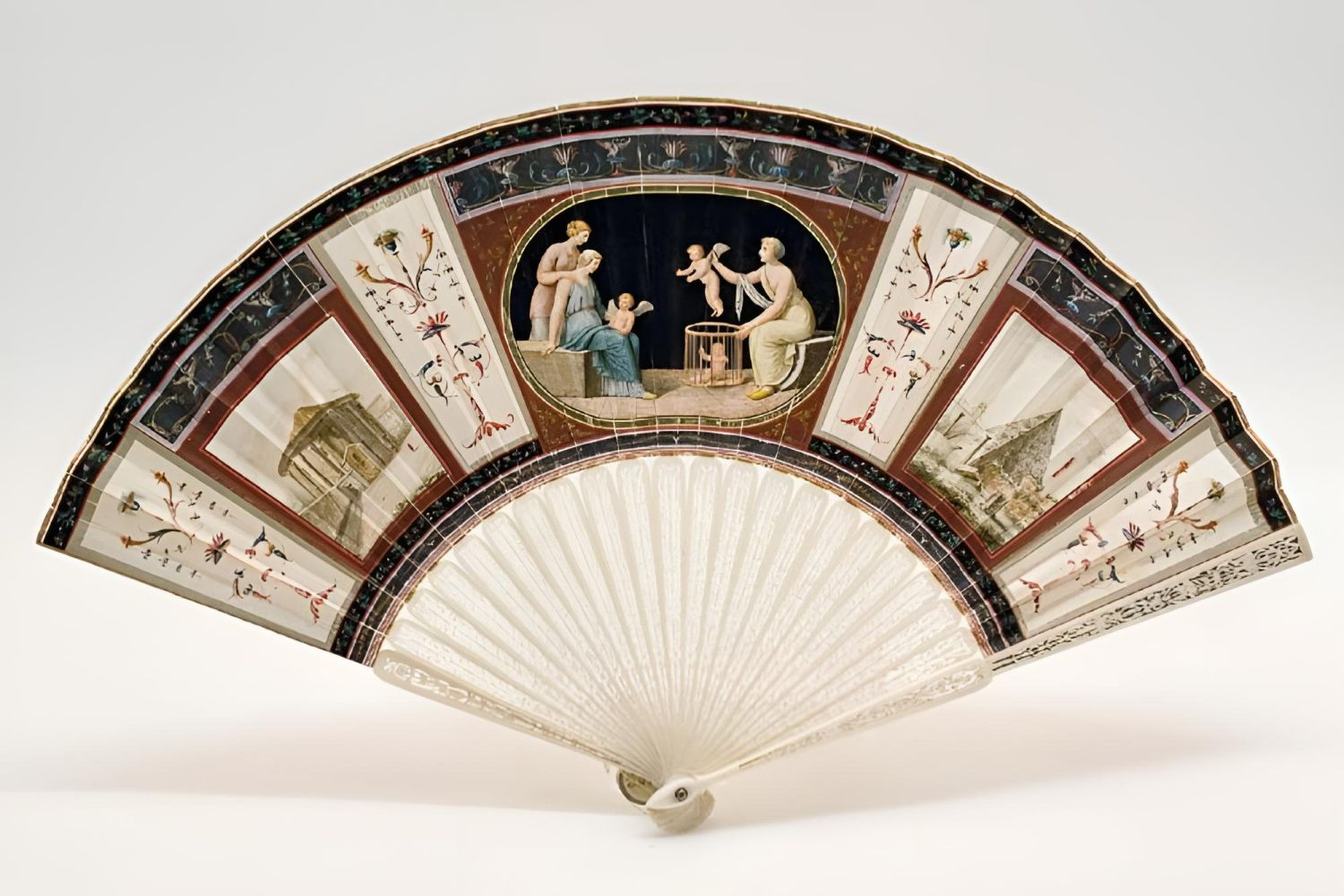
Souvenirs from Naples, c. 1800

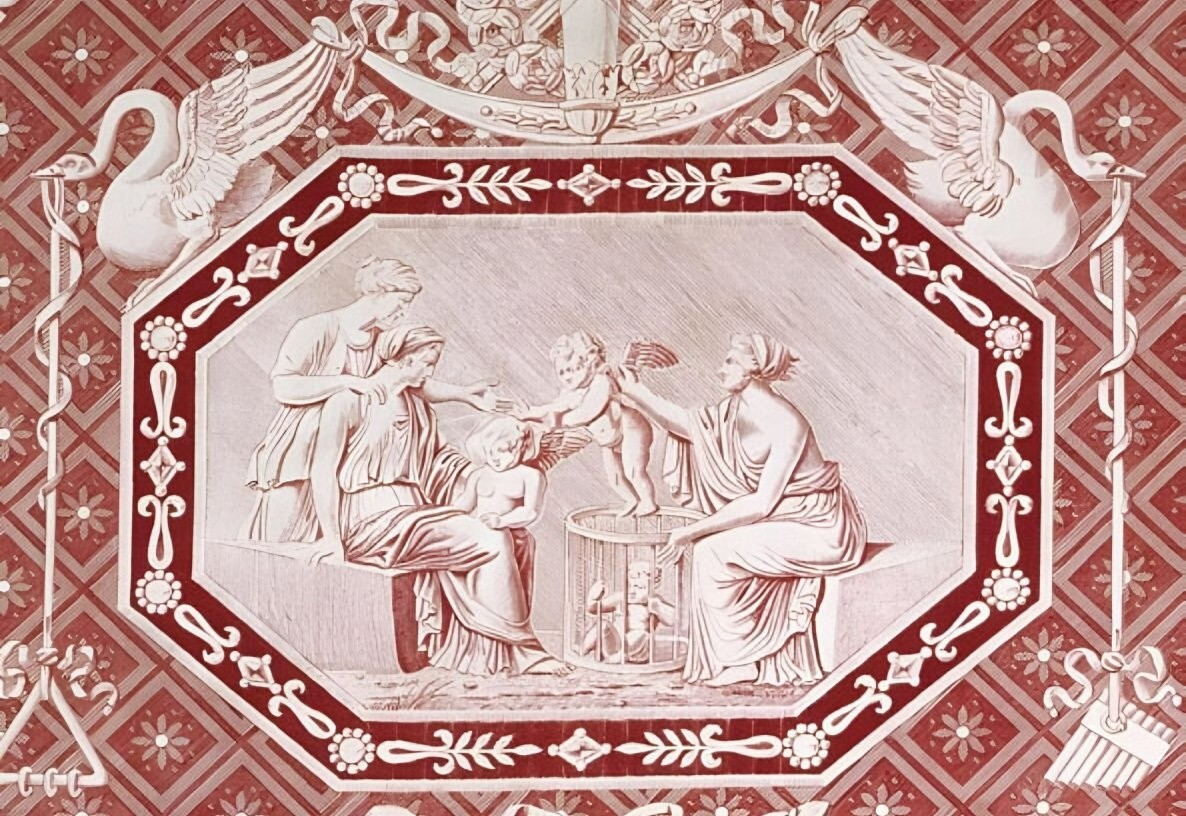
Cotton wall covering (c. 1816)

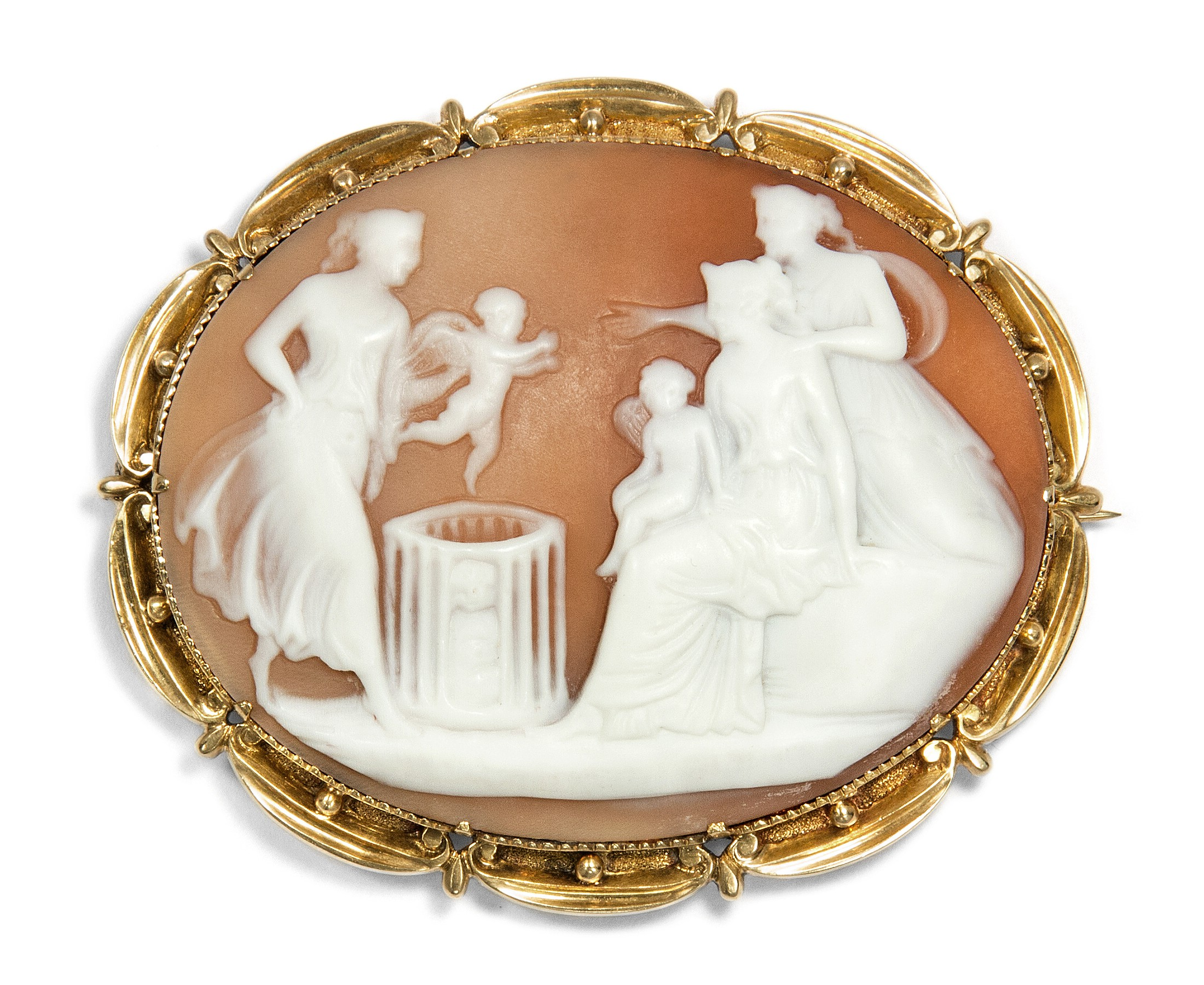
Mussel shell cameo (c. 1830)

Over time and until the mid-19th century, the enthusiasm for ancient works of art also spread to everyday culture, particularly The Culture Seller into interior design, such as textile wall coverings, small bronze or porcelain sculptures, jewellery, plaques, cameos, containers and accessories of all types, modifying the original in many ways. In terms of impact, the original fresco is now one of the most important works from ancient Roman art, continuing to inspire artists in the 20th century.

== Bibliography ==
- (in German) Lothar Freund: Amor, Amoretten. In: Reallexikon zur Deutschen Kunstgeschichte. Vol. I, 1935, Sp. 641–651 (Digitalisat).
- (in German) Thomas W. Gaehtgens: Diderot und Vien: Ein Beitrag zu Diderots klassizistischer Ästhetik. In: Zeitschrift für Kunstgeschichte. Volume 36, 1973, S. 51–82 (Online version).
- Victoria C. Gardner Coates, Kenneth D. S. Lapatin, Jon L. Seydl (ed.s): The Last Days of Pompeii: Decadence, Apocalypse, Resurrection. Getty Publications, Los Angeles 2012, ISBN 9781606061152, S. 90–95.
- (in German) Stephanie Hauschild: Wer kauft Liebesgötter? Kunstgewerbeverein Frankfurt am Main e.V., Frankfurt 2015 (Online version).
