= The Cupid Seller =

1763 painting by Joseph-Marie Vien

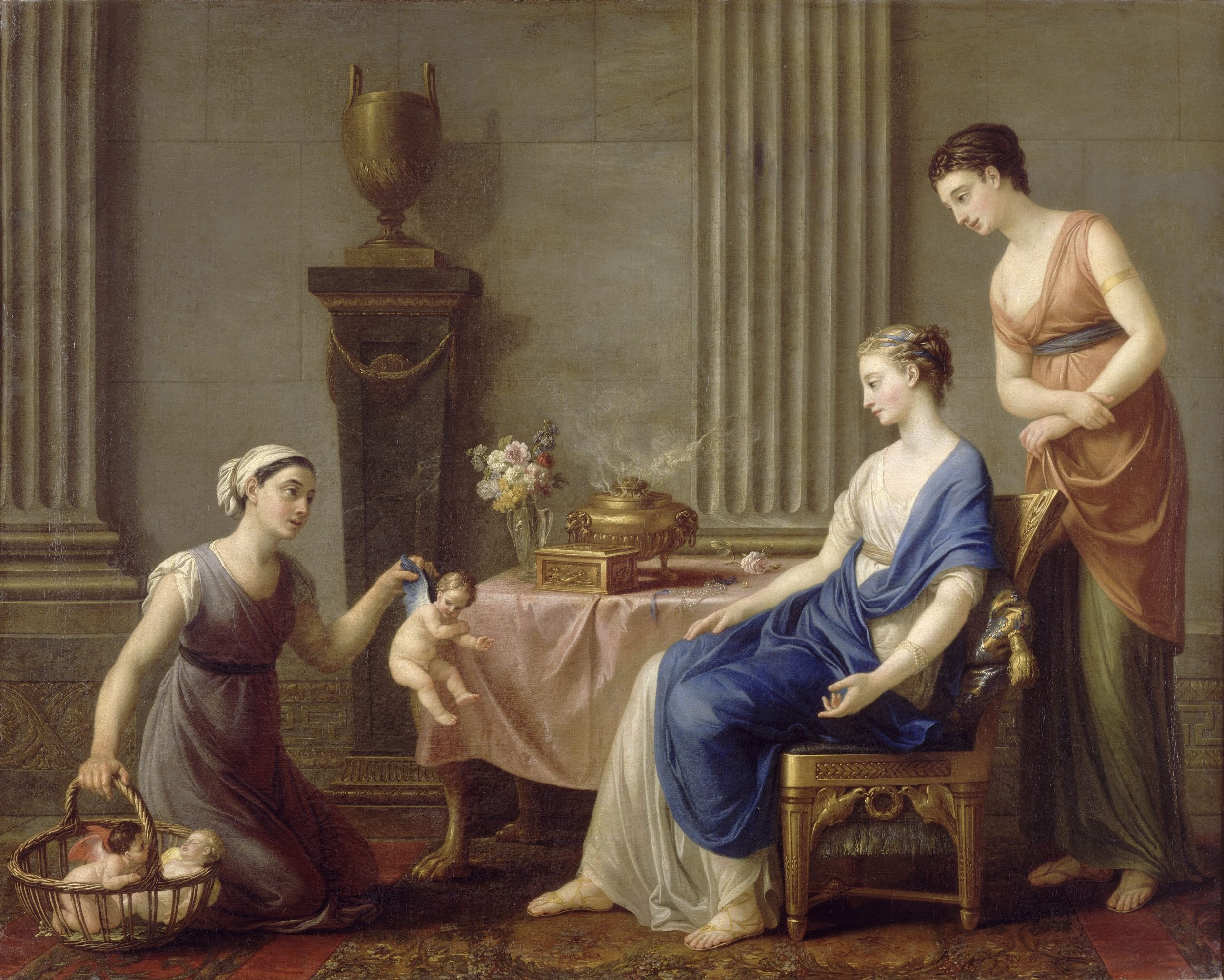
- Artist: Joseph-Marie Vien
- Year: 1763
- Type: Oil on canvas
- Dimensions: 98 cm × 122 cm (39 in × 48 in)
- Location: Palace of Fontainebleau, Fontainebleau

The Cupid Seller (French: La Marchande d’Amours) or The Accessories Seller (La Marchande à la toilette) is an oil on canvas painting by the French artist Joseph-Marie Vien, from 1763. One of the earliest works of French neo-classicism, it is based on an ancient fresco of the same name from Stabiae and shows a woman selling tiny cupids.

The work was acquired around 1778 by Louis Hercule Timoléon de Cossé, 8th Duke of Brissac, governor of Paris, who gave it to his mistress Marie-Jeanne Bécu, Comtesse du Barry in 1788 (she had previously been Louis XV's mistress). She was an important patron of Vien and kept the work at her chateau in Louveciennes, which was plundered in 1791 during the French Revolution, with the painting confiscated by the state. De Cossé-Brissac and du Barry both fell victim to the Revolution soon afterwards.

In 1837, during the July Monarchy, the work was taken to Palace of Fontainebleau, where it was hung in the chambers of Helene, Duchess of Orleans, daughter in law of Louis-Philippe of France. It remains at Fontainebleau, in the 'Galerie des Fastes', on loan from the Louvre.

== History ==
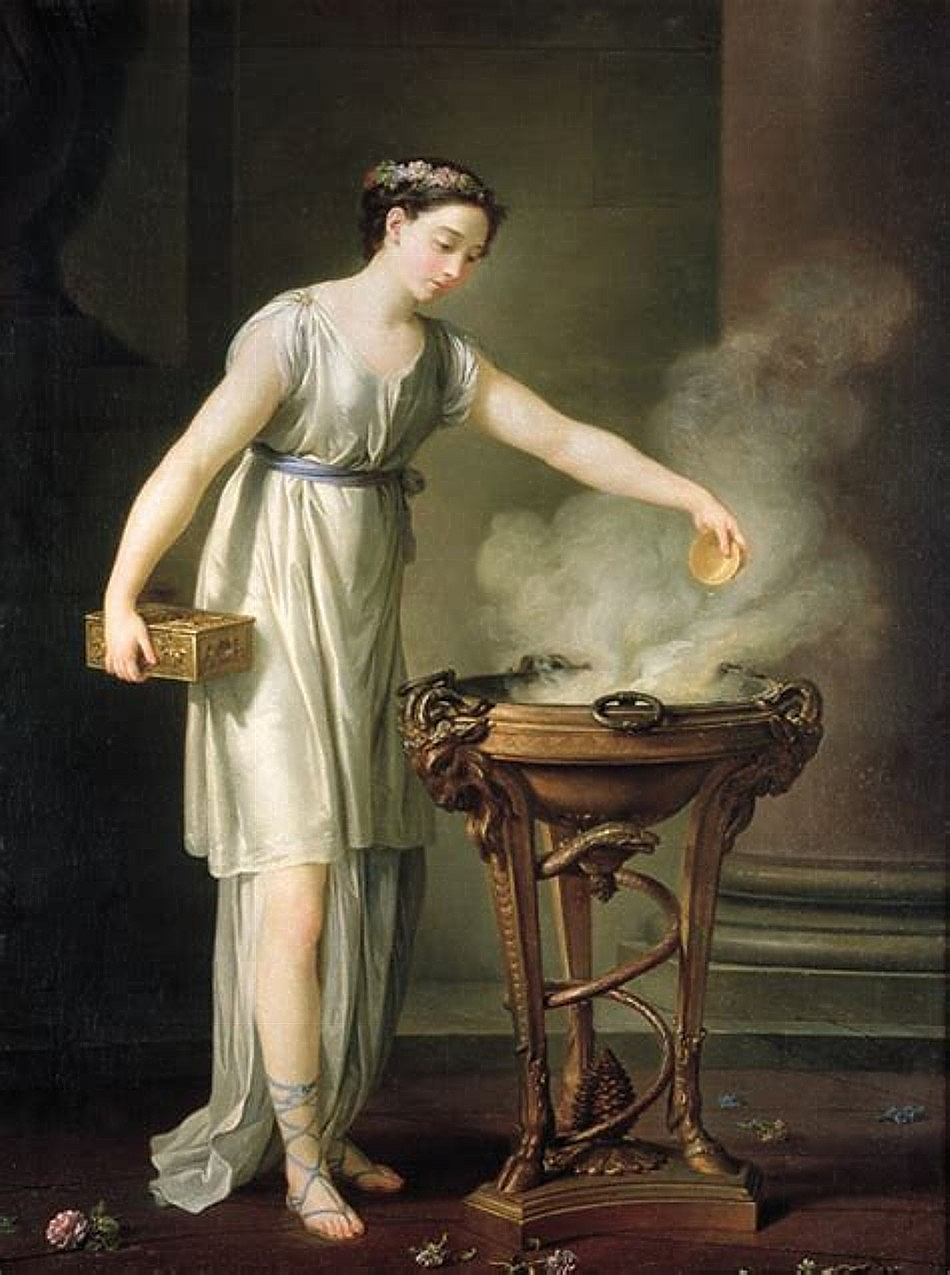
The Virtuous Athenian Woman by Joseph-Marie Vien (1762)

After Vien had studied ancient encaustic painting technique under the archaeologist and writer Anne-Claude-Philippe, Comte de Caylus in the mid-1750s and had created many works in the technique such as Minerva, he gave up on it and shifted to genre scenes set in the classical world. He believed that genre painting based on ancient models could reconstruct the culture and lifestyle of ancient Rome and Greece. This also shows the influence of de Caylus, whose Nouveaux sujets de Peinture et de Sculpture recommended studying not only ancient heroes' deeds but also genre scenes of everyday life.

Vien initially concentrated on ancient Greek life, producing The Virtuous Athenian Woman and The Young Corinthian Woman, both exhibited at the Paris Salon in the 1760s. These 'goût grec' paintings were a great success, as their idealised beauty and cultivated simplicity suggested that ancient taste in art was recognisable to present-day people. For several years Vien devoted himself exclusively to this type of painting, producing Seller in 1763, differing from his other works of that kind in that it was based directly on an ancient model.

The original fresco on which the work was based had been discovered in 1759 and was published in 1762 as a copperplate by Giovanni Elia Morghen after a drawing by Carlo Nolli, that copperplate probably serving as a model for Vien's work. Until the mid 18th century, such ancient paintings were known almost exclusively via literature such as Pliny the Elder, since only a few figurative representations and ornamental decorations had been discovered since the Renaissance. The rediscovery of ancient frescoes in Herculaneum and Stabiae therefore caused a great stir. Vien now had the opportunity to recreate ancient painting through direct observation, after having already dealt with ancient themes and painting techniques in the 1750s.

== Reception and influence ==
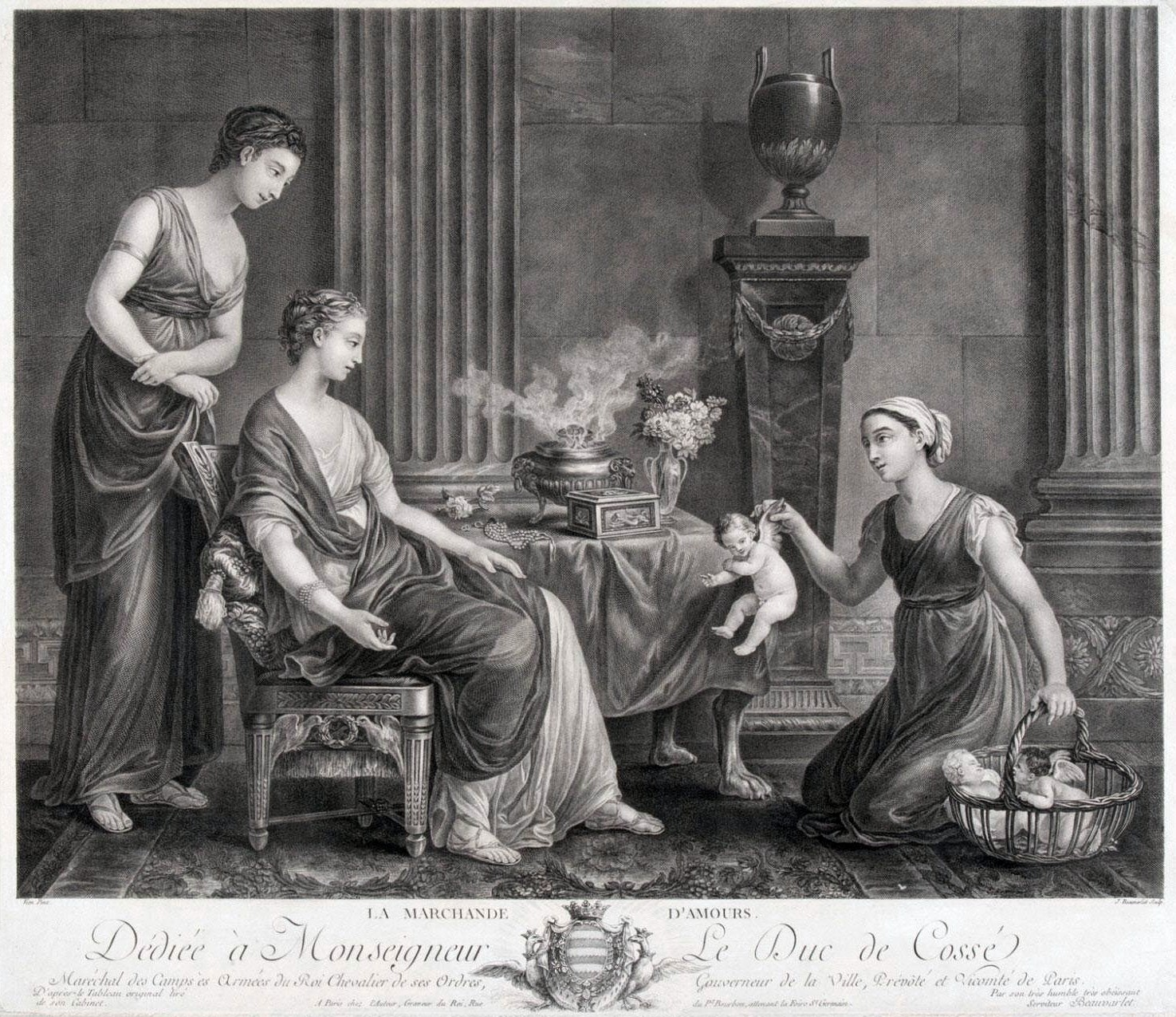
Copperplate by Jacques-Firmin Beauvarlet dedicated to the Duc de Cossé-Brissac (1778)

Exhibited at the Salon of 1763 alongside other works by Vien and an illustration of the source fresco, the opportunity for comparison with an ancient model caused a huge public stir. There it was entitled The Accessories Seller, then a modern term. The depiction of every details was praised, such as the careful depiction of the folds of the garment, the carving of the chair, the pattern on the carpet and the still life on the table. Antiquity was definitely recognized as a model and Vien's successful imitation of the ancient style also lauded.

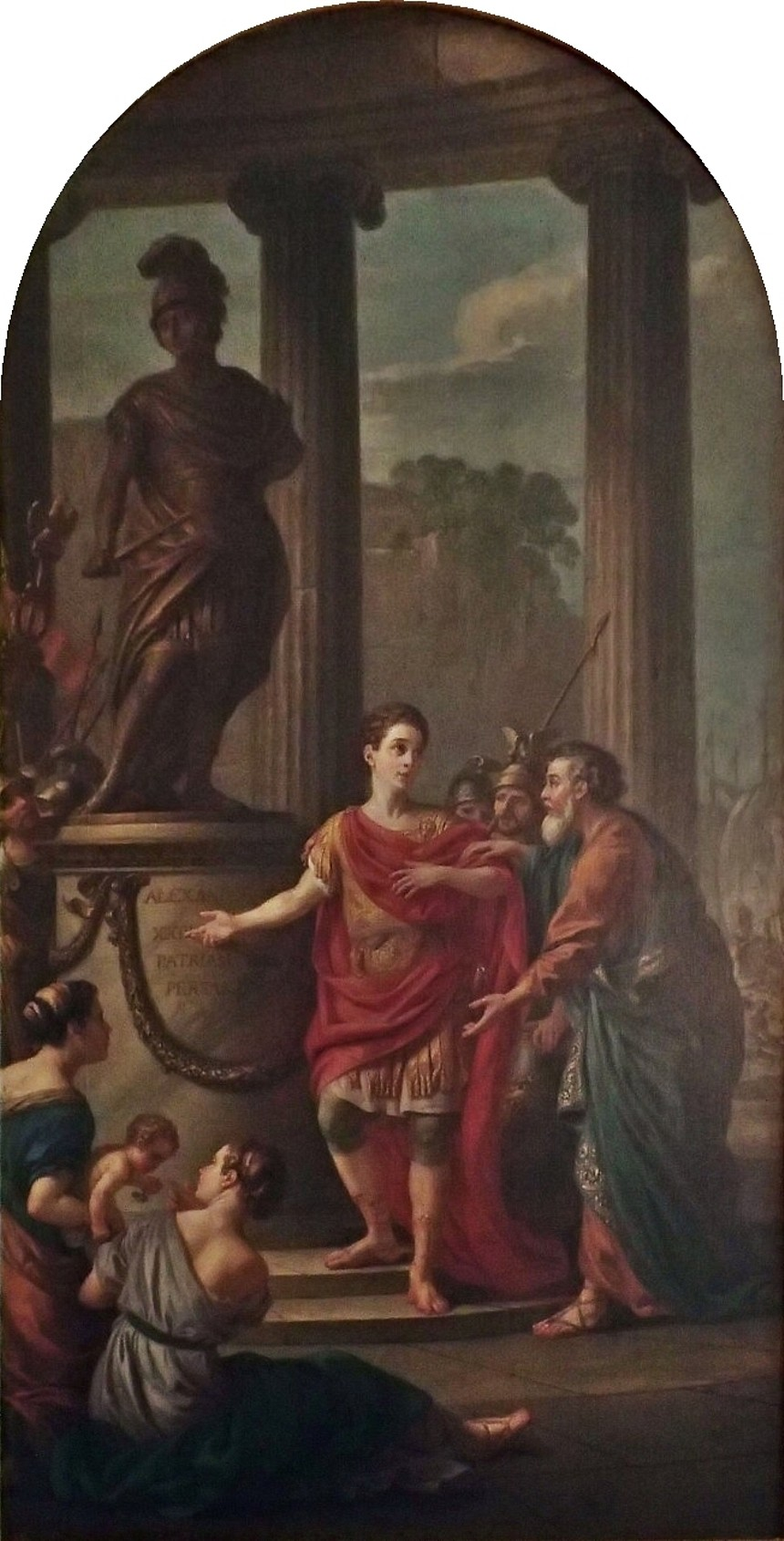
Caesar in front of the statue of Alexander by Joseph-Marie Vien (1767)

The writer and art critic Denis Diderot in particular praised the perfect painting style, the harmonious colours and the picture's taste and poetry on the whole, comparing it favourably against works by François Boucher and his students, denouncing their whole Rococo style as outdated and praising Vien's classicist style as an opportunity to renew French painting and to bring an end to what he considered to be the tasteless art produced ever since the Régence.

Diderot and his contemporaries viewed Vien's painting as a successful attempt to use ancient models in the present day to renew the late Baroque painting, which had fallen into crisis. Vien was thus the first painter in France to take the step towards the classicism of the 18th and 19th centuries. The original fresco and Vien's variation both remained famous for many years, even beyond France, with Jacques Firmin Beauvarlet making a large-scale print of Vien's painting, which was exhibited at the Salon of 1779 and further popularized the image. The fresco, Vien's work and associated prints all inspired reproductions ranging from textiles and porcelain to bas-reliefs and engraved gems.

After the work's success, genre paintings à la grecque became fashionable and numerous French artists created pictures in this style. Vien's paintings were also reproduced and distributed as copperplate engravings years later. However, Vien turned to other genres and dealt with historical, mythological and religious themes, since history painting was then seen as the highest of all the genres. Diderot, who had recently praised Vien's paintings, criticized his history paintings, including Caesar in front of the Statue of Alexander, shown at the 1767 Salon. His history paintings still used the same style as his classicising genre painting and it was only his student Jacques-Louis David's 1782 Oath of the Horatii which successfully brought classicism into history painting.

== Bibliography ==
- (in German) Lothar Freund: Amor, Amoretten. In: Reallexikon zur Deutschen Kunstgeschichte. Volume 1, 1935, Sp. 641–651 (Online version).
- (in German) Thomas W. Gaehtgens: Diderot und Vien: Ein Beitrag zu Diderots klassizistischer Ästhetik. In: Zeitschrift für Kunstgeschichte. Volume 36, 1973, S. 51–82 (Online version).
- Victoria C. Gardner Coates, Kenneth D. S. Lapatin, Jon L. Seydl (Hrsg.): The Last Days of Pompeii: Decadence, Apocalypse, Resurrection. Getty Publications, Los Angeles 2012, ISBN 9781606061152, S. 90–95.
- Michele George (ed.): Roman slavery and Roman material culture. University of Toronto Press, Toronto 2013, ISBN 9781442644571, S. 171.
- (in German) Stephanie Hauschild: Wer kauft Liebesgötter? Kunstgewerbeverein Frankfurt am Main e.V., Frankfurt 2015 (Online version).
