= National Roman Museum of Palazzo Massimo =

Museum in Rome, Italy

Museo Nazionale Romano Palazzo Massimo alle Terme
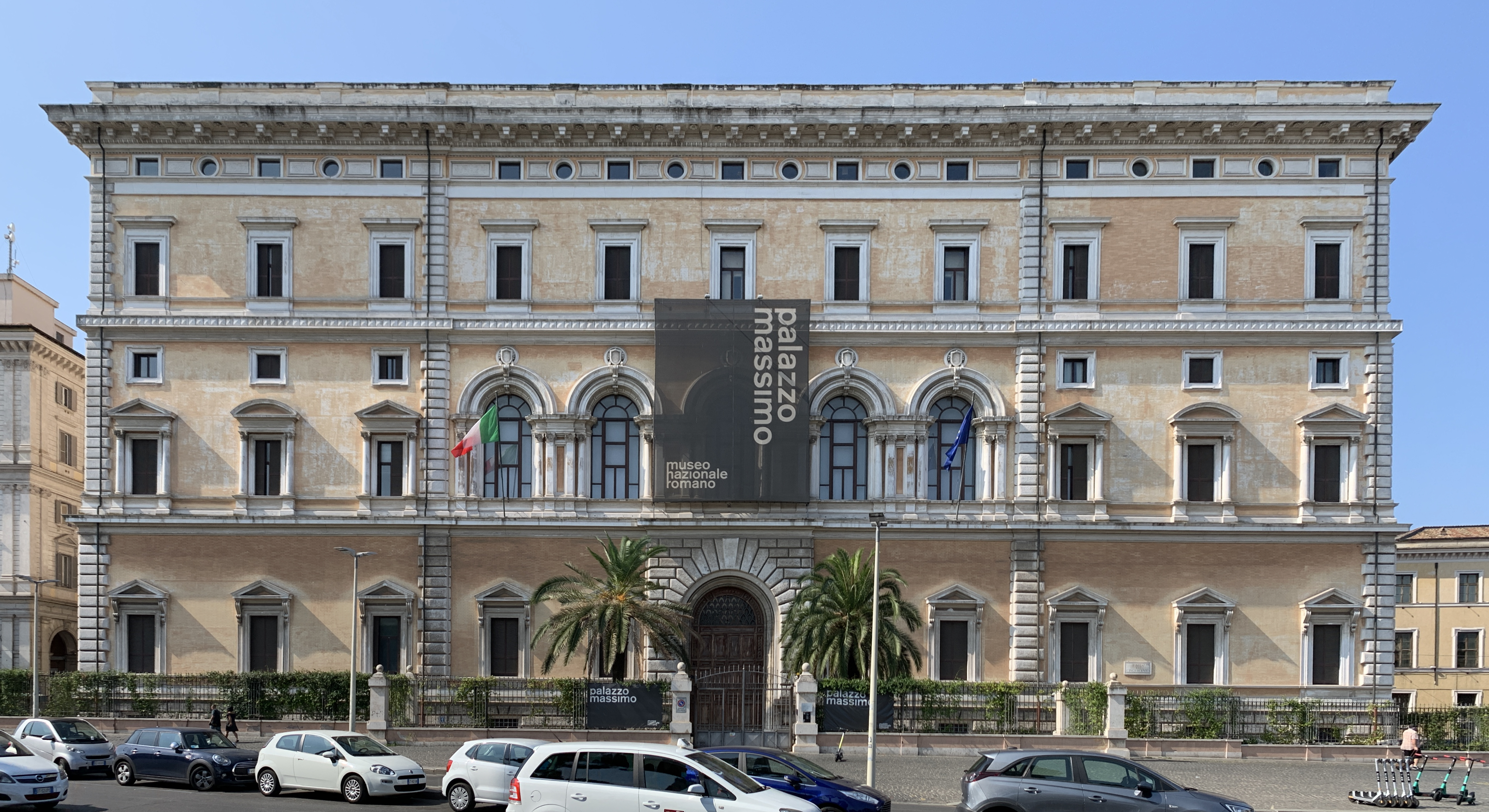
- The entrance to the museum

- Location within Rome
- Established: 1995
- Location: Rome, Italy
- Coordinates: 41°54′05″N 12°29′54″E
- Type: Archaeology museum
- Director: Stéphane Verger
- Website: Official website

The Palazzo Massimo alle Terme is the main of the four sites of the Roman National Museum, along with the original site of the Baths of Diocletian, which currently houses the epigraphic and protohistoric section, Palazzo Altemps, home to the Renaissance collections of ancient sculpture, and the Crypta Balbi, home to the early medieval collection.

It is located in the Esquilino district, near Termini Station.

== Visitors ==
In 2013, the museum circuit of the Roman National Museum was the 21st most visited Italian state site, with 247,795 visitors and a total gross income of 909,016.50 euros.

== History ==
Palazzo Massimo was rebuilt between 1883 and 1886 by architect Camillo Pistrucci on the Villa Montalto-Peretti as the site of a college for the Jesuits, which remained there until 1960.

After ups and downs it was purchased by the state in 1981 and restored, based on a design by architect Costantino Dardi. This was made possible by funding from a special law for the protection of the Roman archaeological heritage.

The building has four floors and an underground one, much of which is devoted to the display of the collections, as well as providing a series of offices, a library, and a conference room.

The museum building was opened in 1995 (when only the ground floor was opened) and completed in 1998 with the opening of the first and second floors in addition to the basement.

== The Museum and the collections on display ==
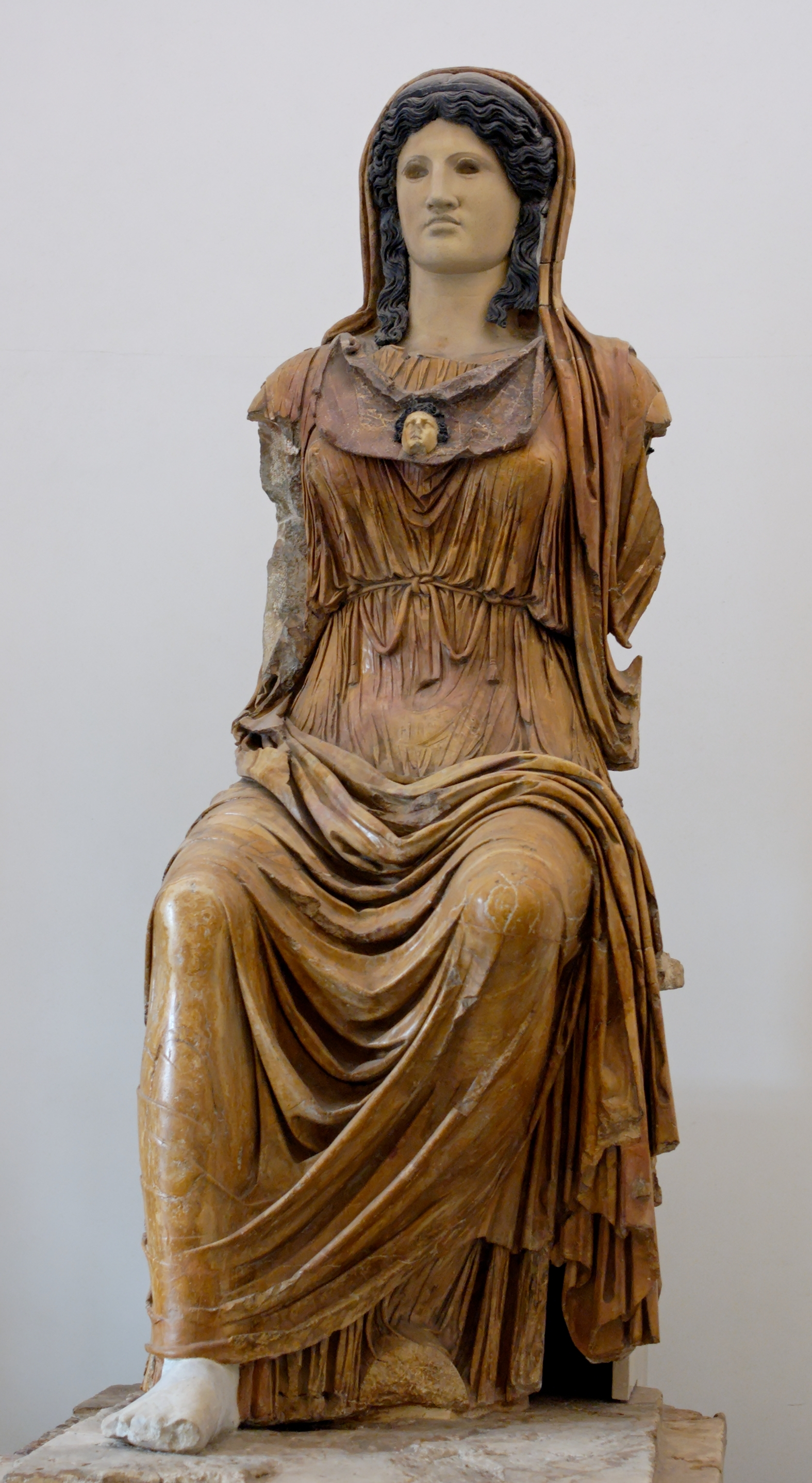
Colossal statue of Minerva, whose face remade in plaster has the likeness of the Athena Carpegna (entrance to the Palazzo Massimo, just past the ticket office).

The exhibition area occupies four of the floors from which the building consists, the other rooms being reserved for offices of the Soprintendenza Speciale Archeologia Belle Arti e Paesaggio di Roma. The museum layout is divided into subsections that illustrate the most important moments in the artistic production of ancient Rome. The museum houses the "ancient art section" with figurative works from the late republican, imperial and late antique periods on the ground floor, first and second floors (including works of art from the great residences of the senatorial order, with Greek originals brought to Rome in ancient times) as well as a "numismatics and goldsmithing section" on aspects of the Roman economy in the basement.

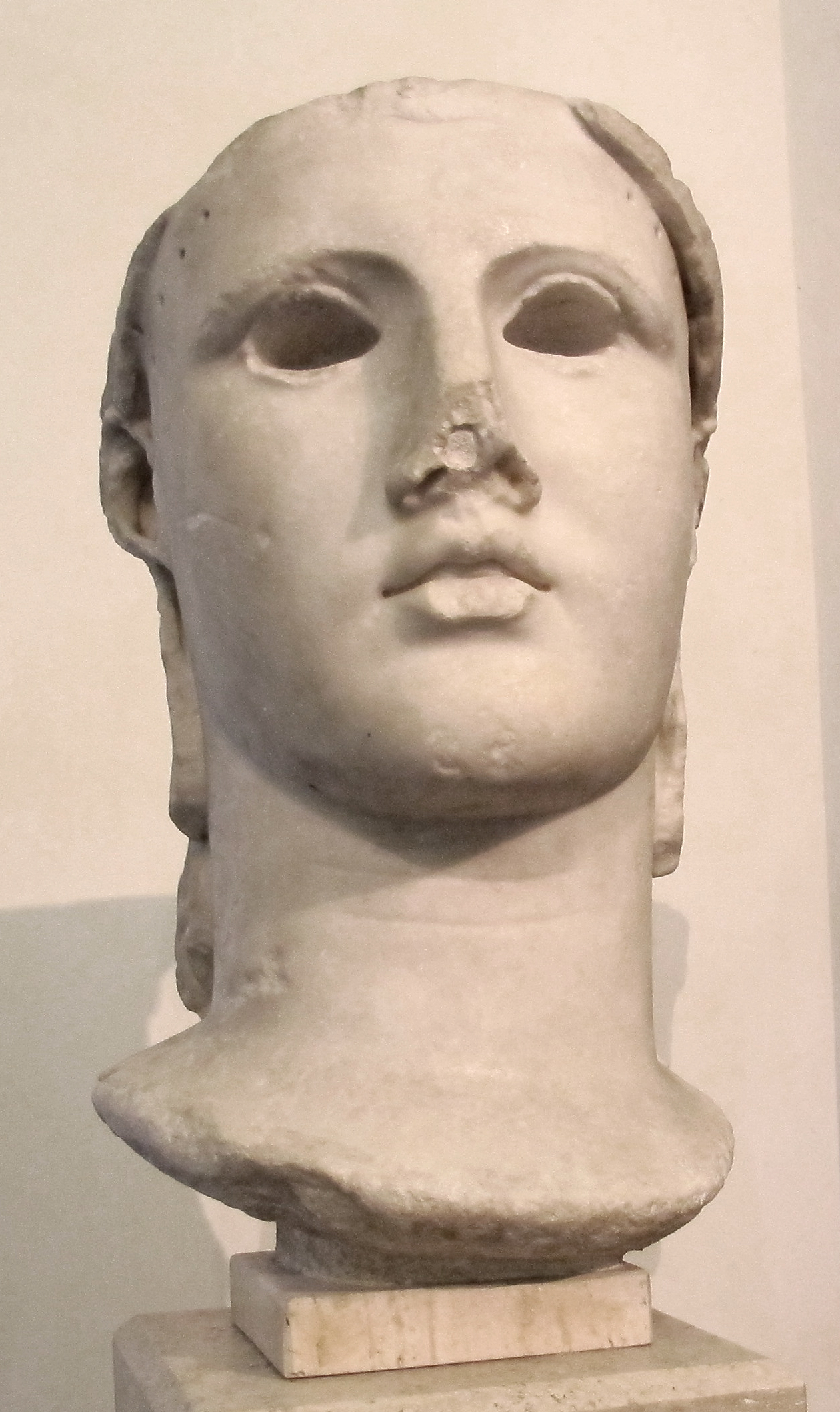
Athena, from Villa Carpegna on the Aurelia (Roman copy from classical Greek original)

== Ground floor ==
The ground floor houses masterpieces of Roman art, from the late Republican age (with works belonging to the ruling classes of the 2nd-1st centuries B.C.), to the time of the Julio-Claudian dynasty. Immediately after the ticket office one encounters a colossal statue of a seated female deity. It comes from the slopes of the Aventine and is composed of numerous types of ancient colored marbles, using a technique highly prized by Roman sculptors. This statue is from the Augustan age and has been restored as Minerva, whose face has been remade in plaster in the likeness of the Athena Carpegna. According to recent studies, however, it seems that the statue depicted Magna Mater-Cybele, an ancient Anatolian deity whose main center of her worship was Pessinus in Phrygia and who, beginning in the Second Punic War, began protecting the Romans.

According to the oracles of the Sibylline Books, the introduction of the Magna Mater cult was a precondition for finally achieving the expulsion of the Carthaginian enemy from Italy. In April 204 B.C., the black stone of Pessinus reached Ostia and was delivered to Publius Cornelius Scipio Nasica, cousin of Publius Scipio and son of Gnaeus Scipio.

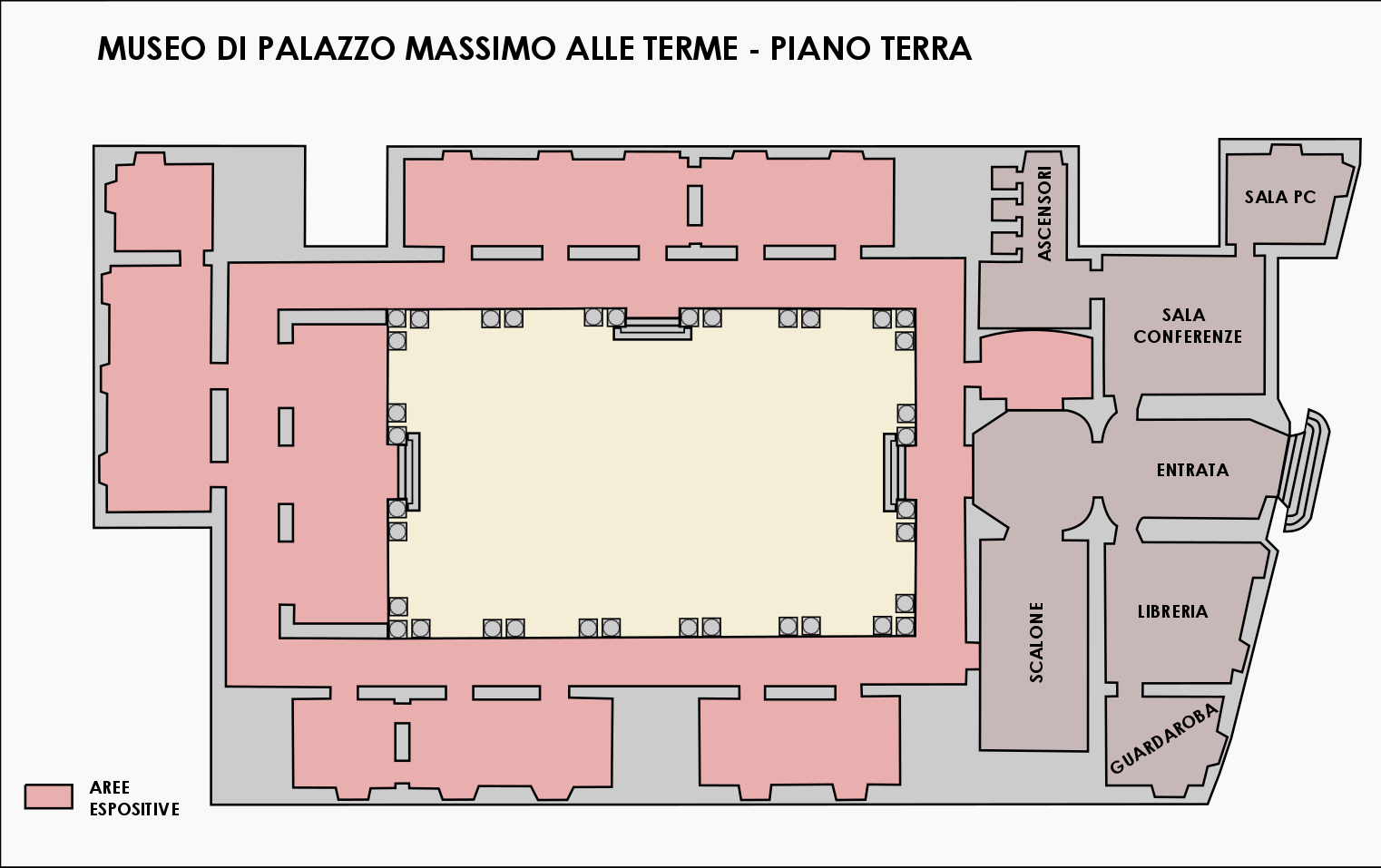
Floor plan of the ground floor of the Roman National Museum at the Palazzo Massimo

=== Gallery I (ground floor) ===
The "Gallery I" displays numerous anonymous male and female portraits. The arrangement evokes a gallery of ancestors, based on what really happened in the dwellings and funerary monuments of ancient Rome. These portraits include that of an elderly woman (from Palombara Sabina) and of a mid-1st century B.C. priest of Isis (found in the Tiber), characterized by a shaved head and a typical vertical scar. The stern and strong-willed portrait proves the spread of the Egyptian cult in Rome, often opposed by the nobilitas, eventually imposed in the capital by the association of Isis with the goddess Fortuna.

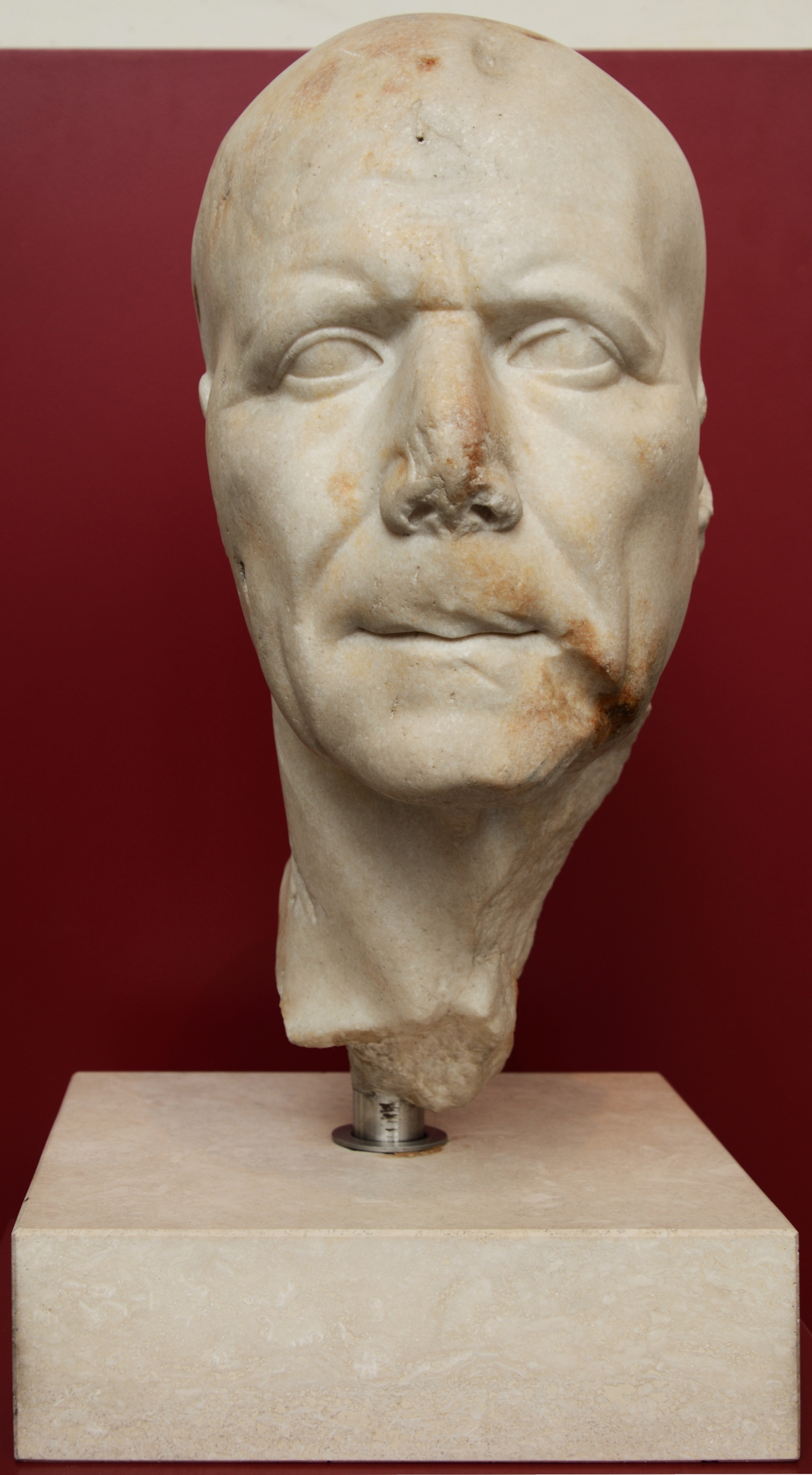
Bust of a priest of Isis (h. 33 cm; datable to the first decades of the 1st century BC).

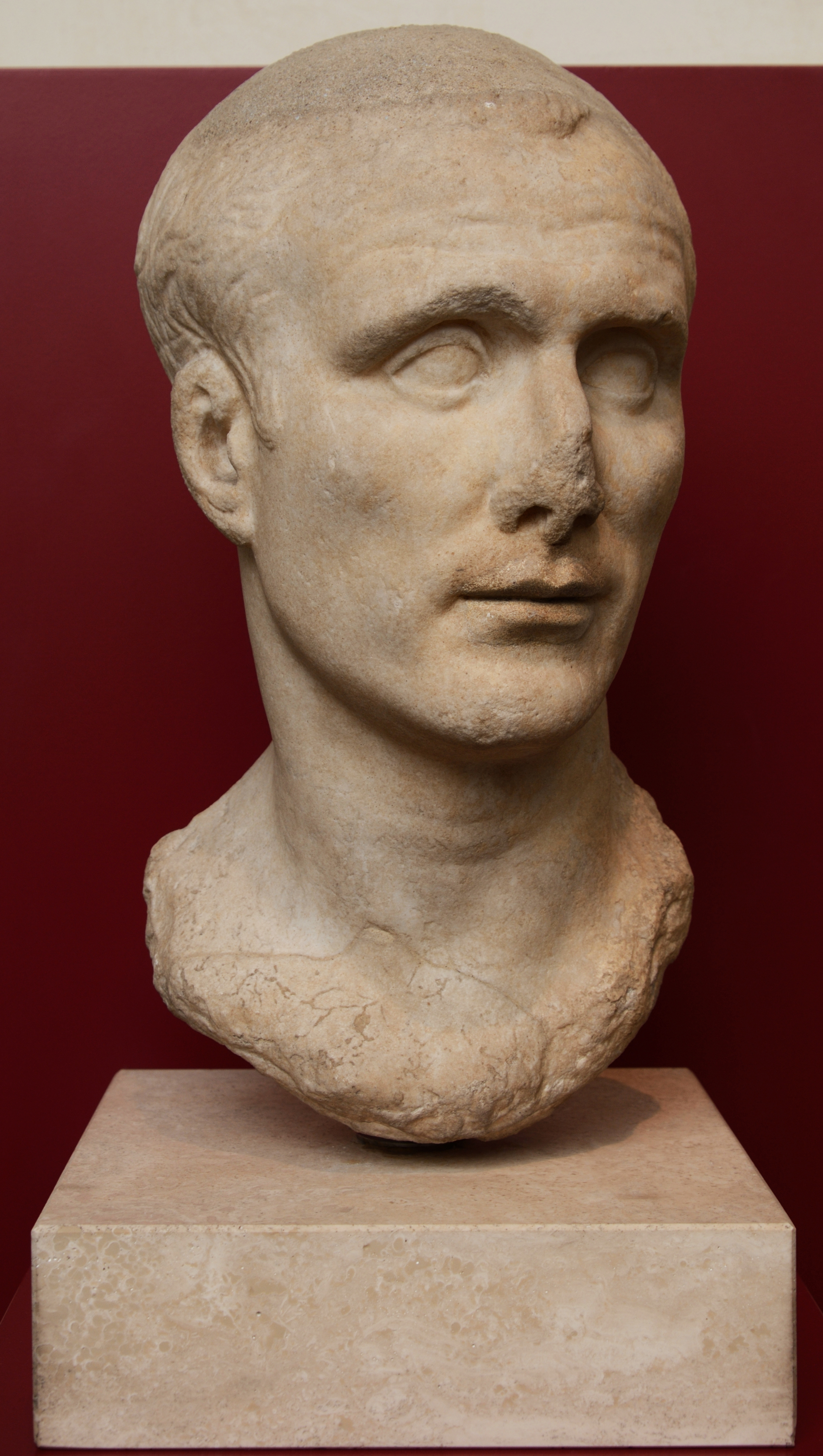
Male portrait of 75-50 B.C. from Palestrina

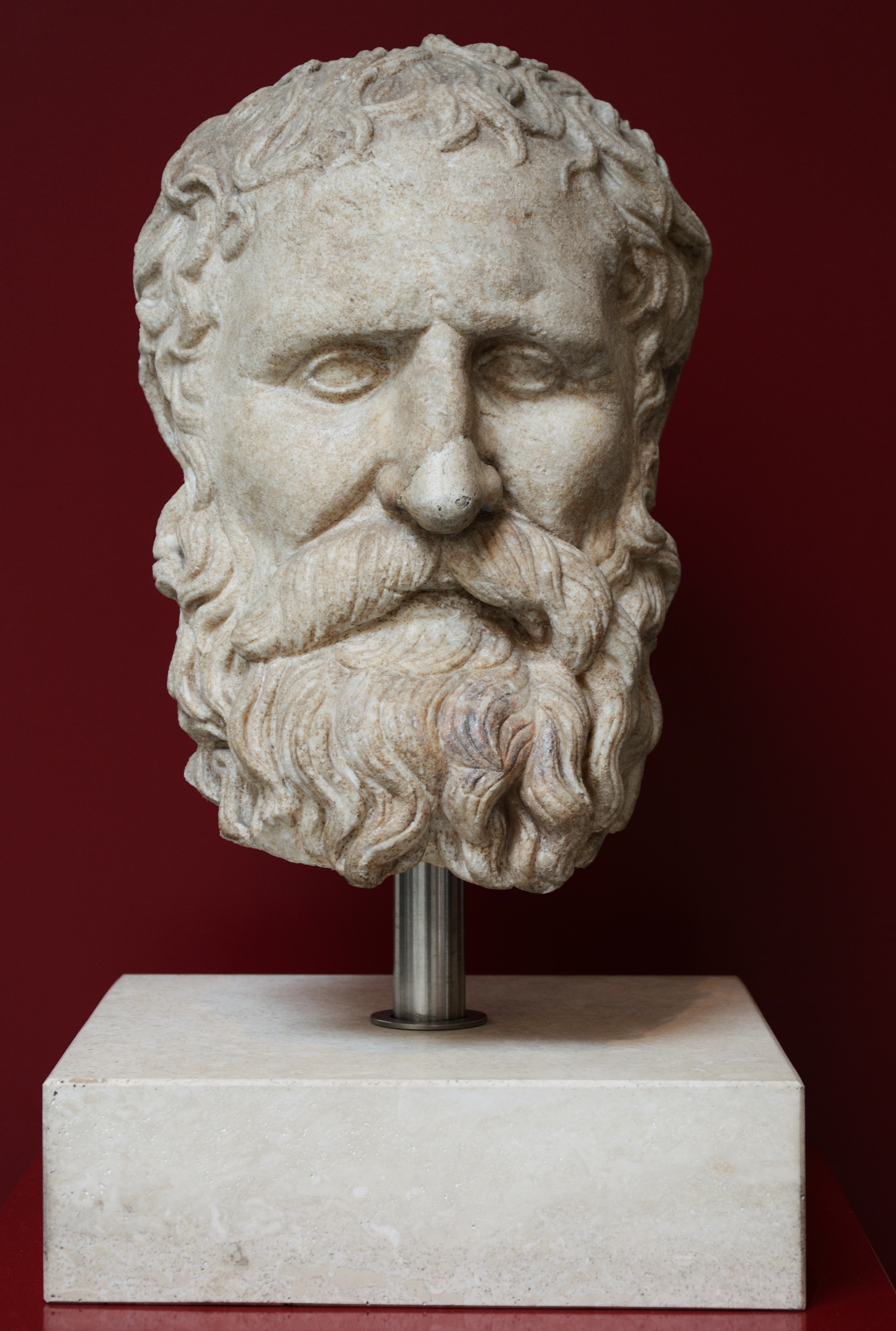
Portrait of a bearded man

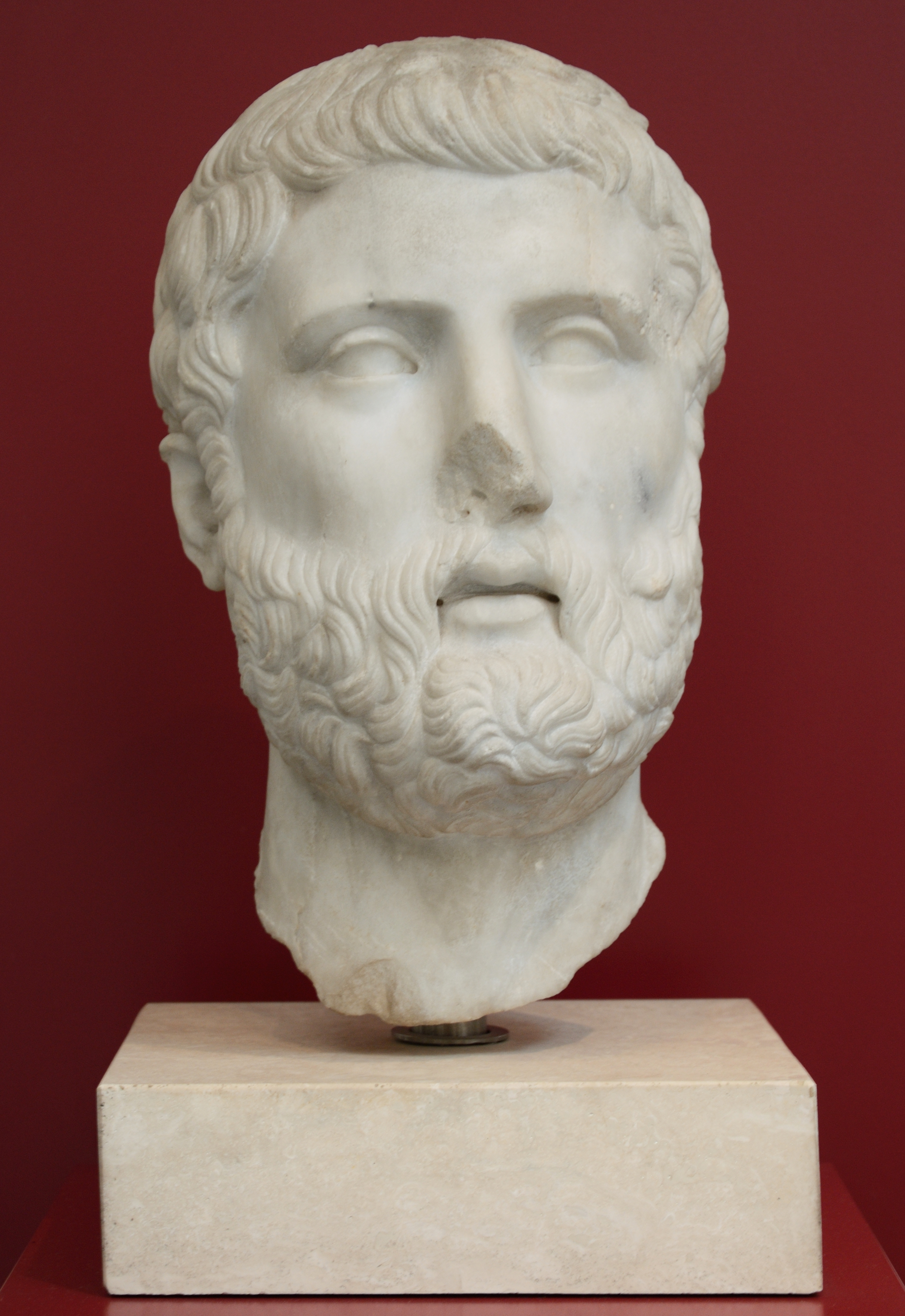
Portrait of a young bearded man

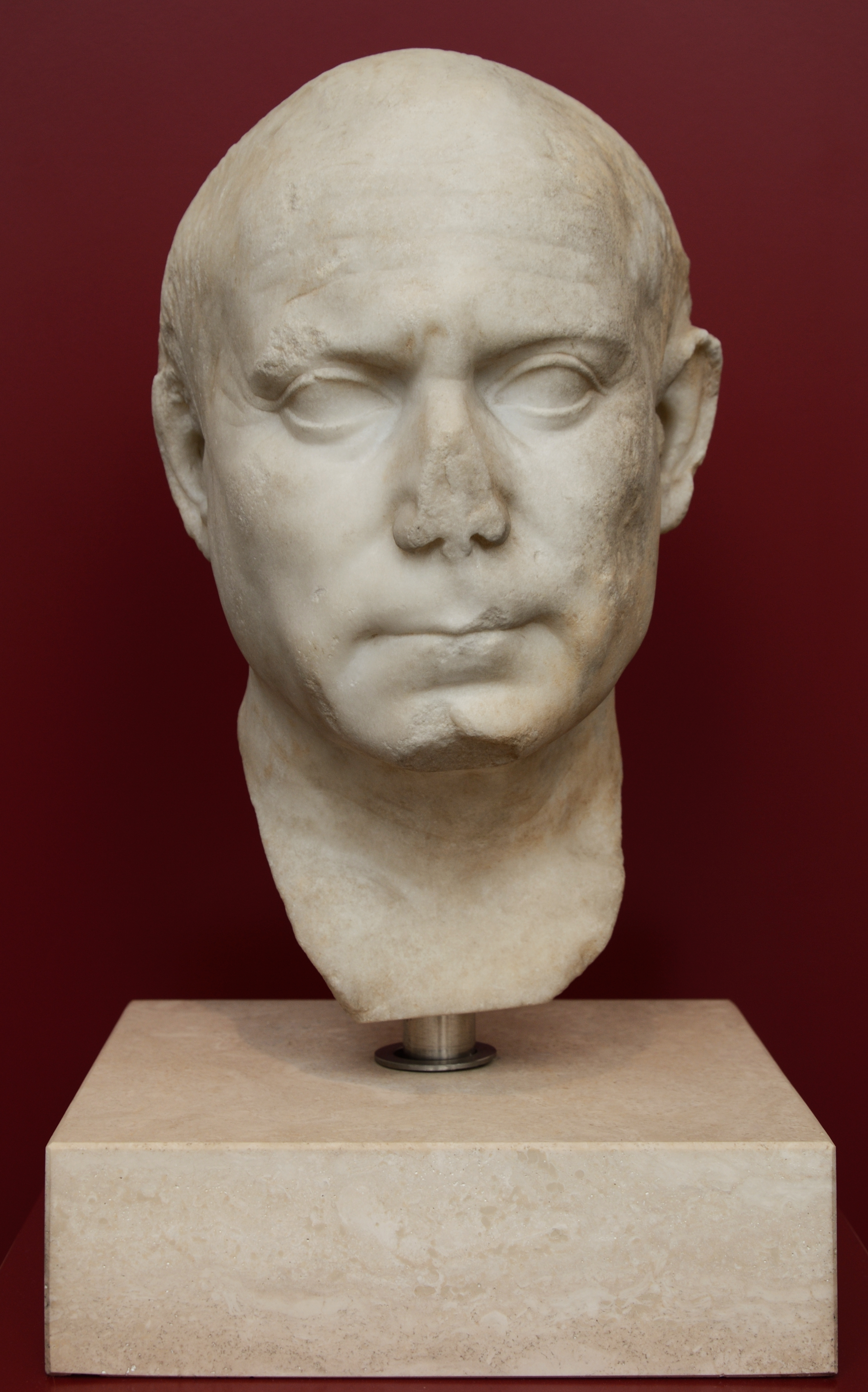
Portrait of a middle-aged man

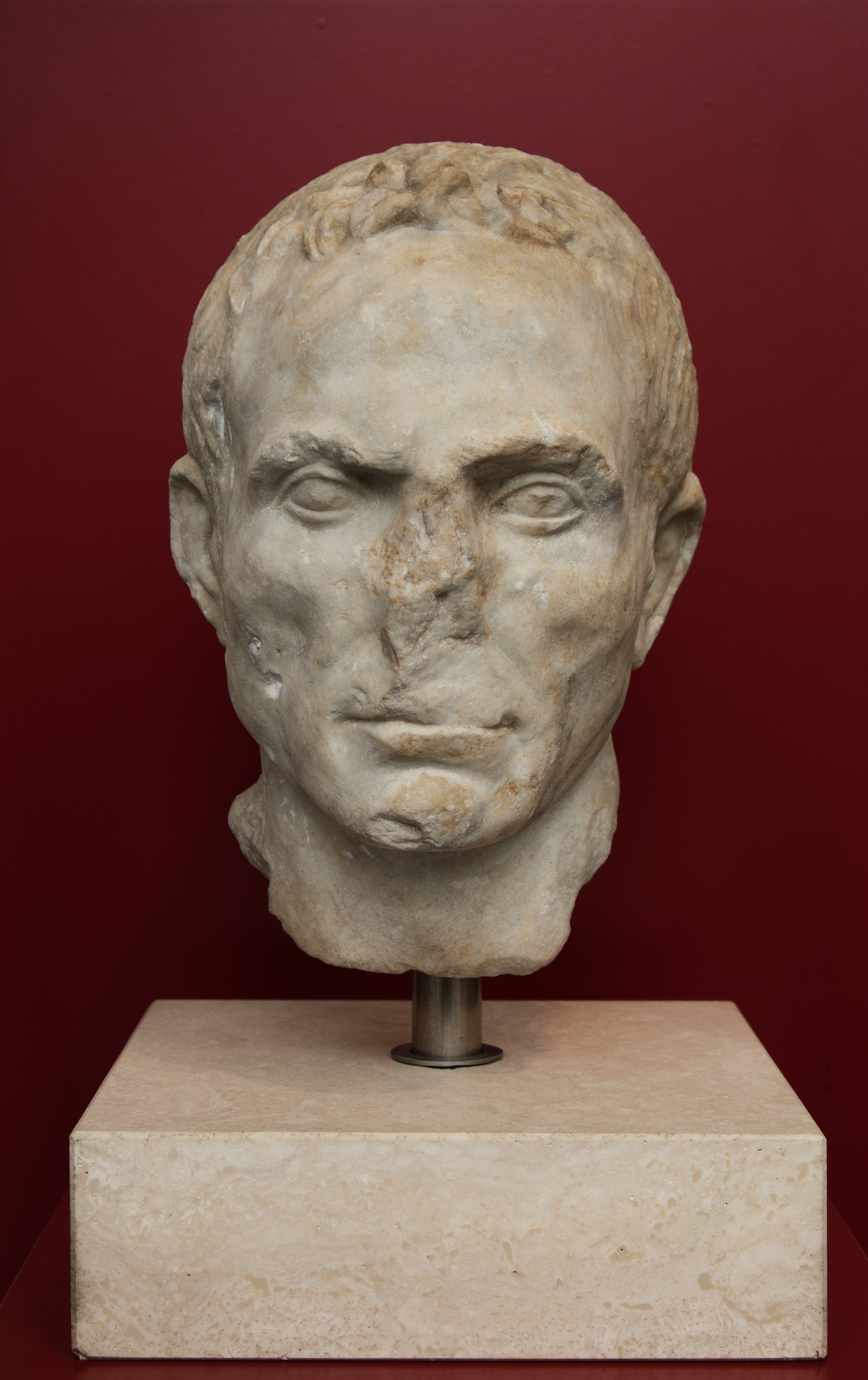
Male portrait datable to 40 BC.

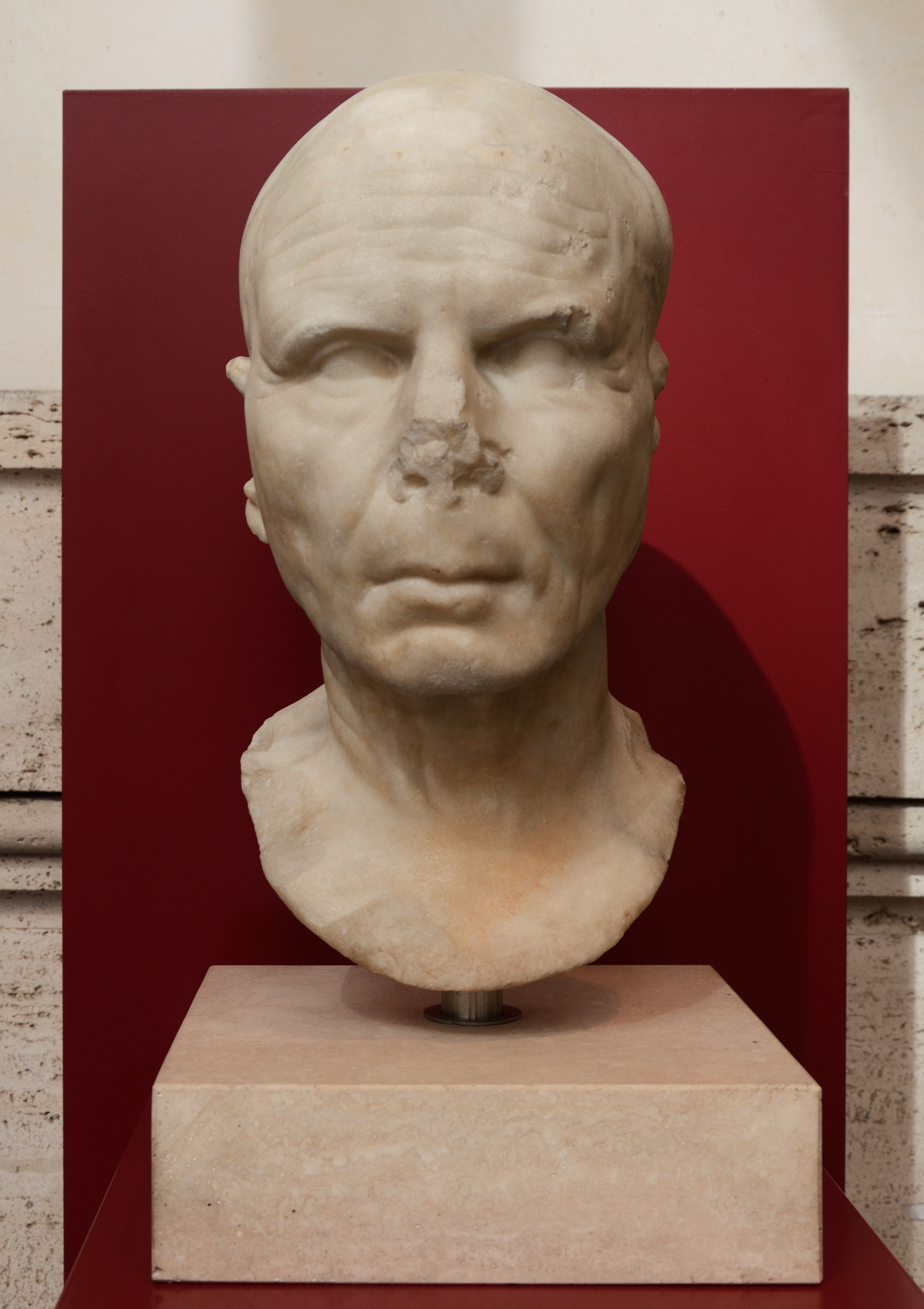
Male portrait from the late 1st century BC.

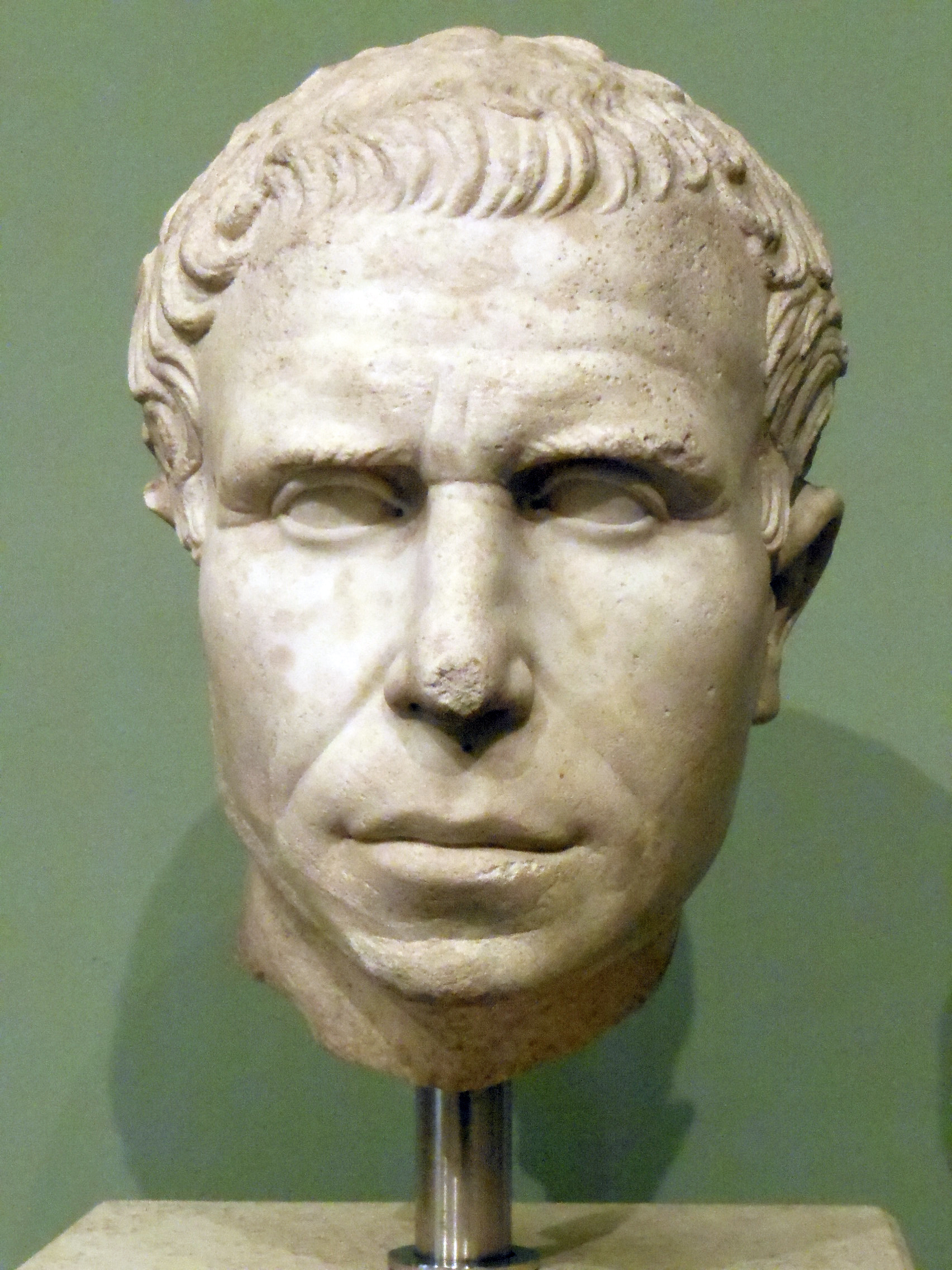
Male portrait from Nemi (Valle Giardino), in Luna marble, (30 BC).

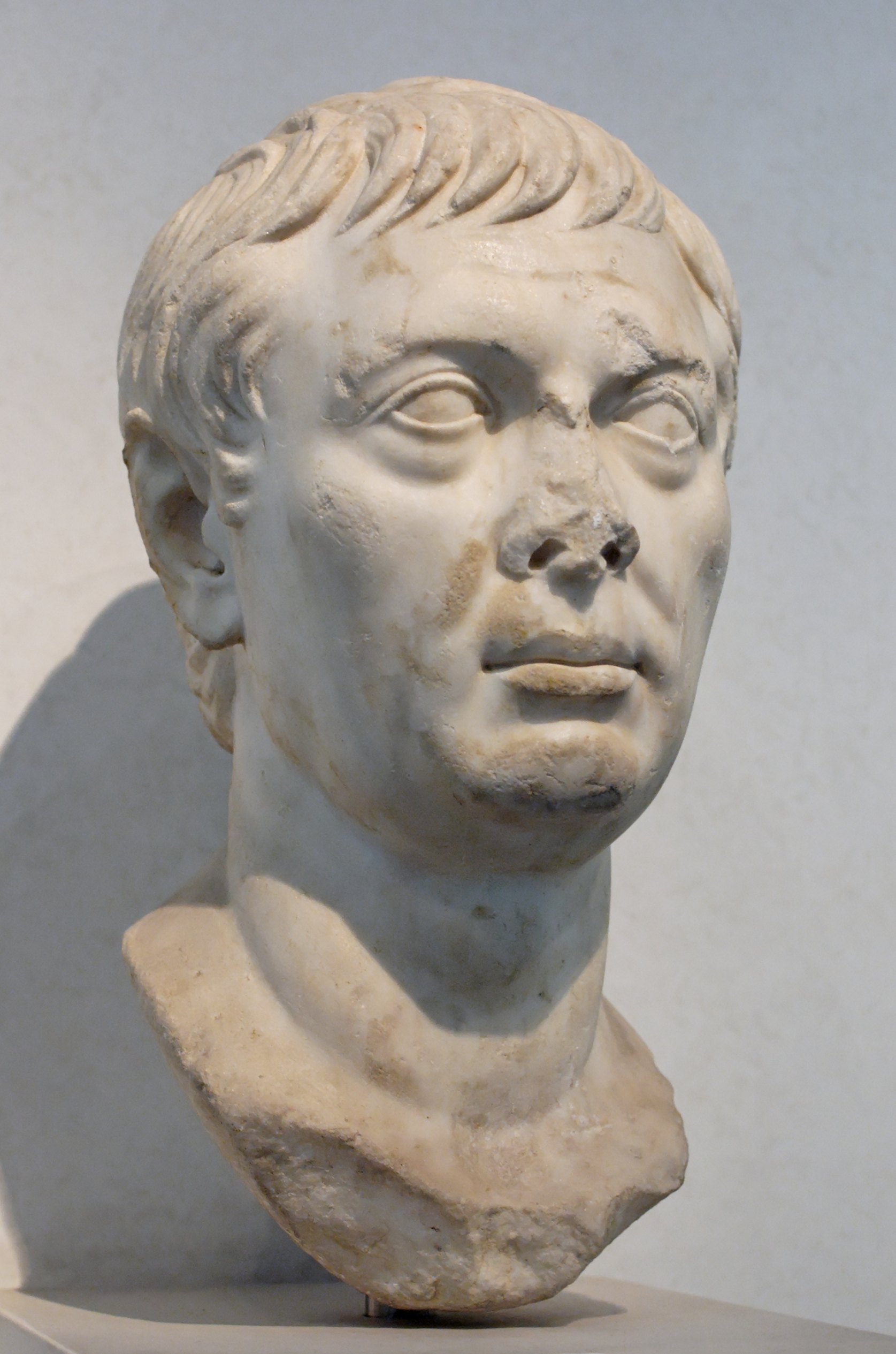
Male portrait (second half of the 1st century BC).
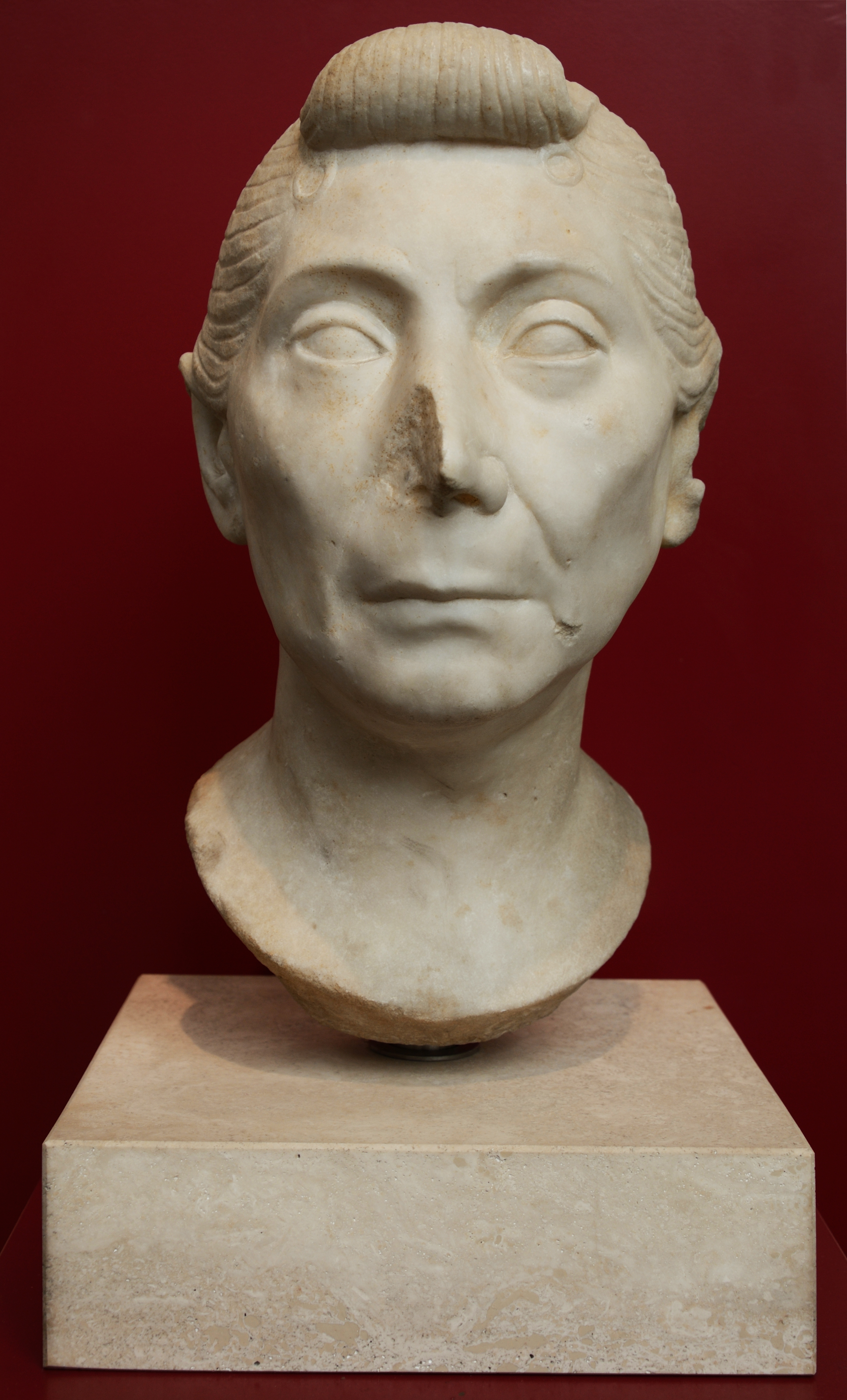
Portrait of elderly woman (from Palombara Sabina; h. 32 cm; late 1st century BC).

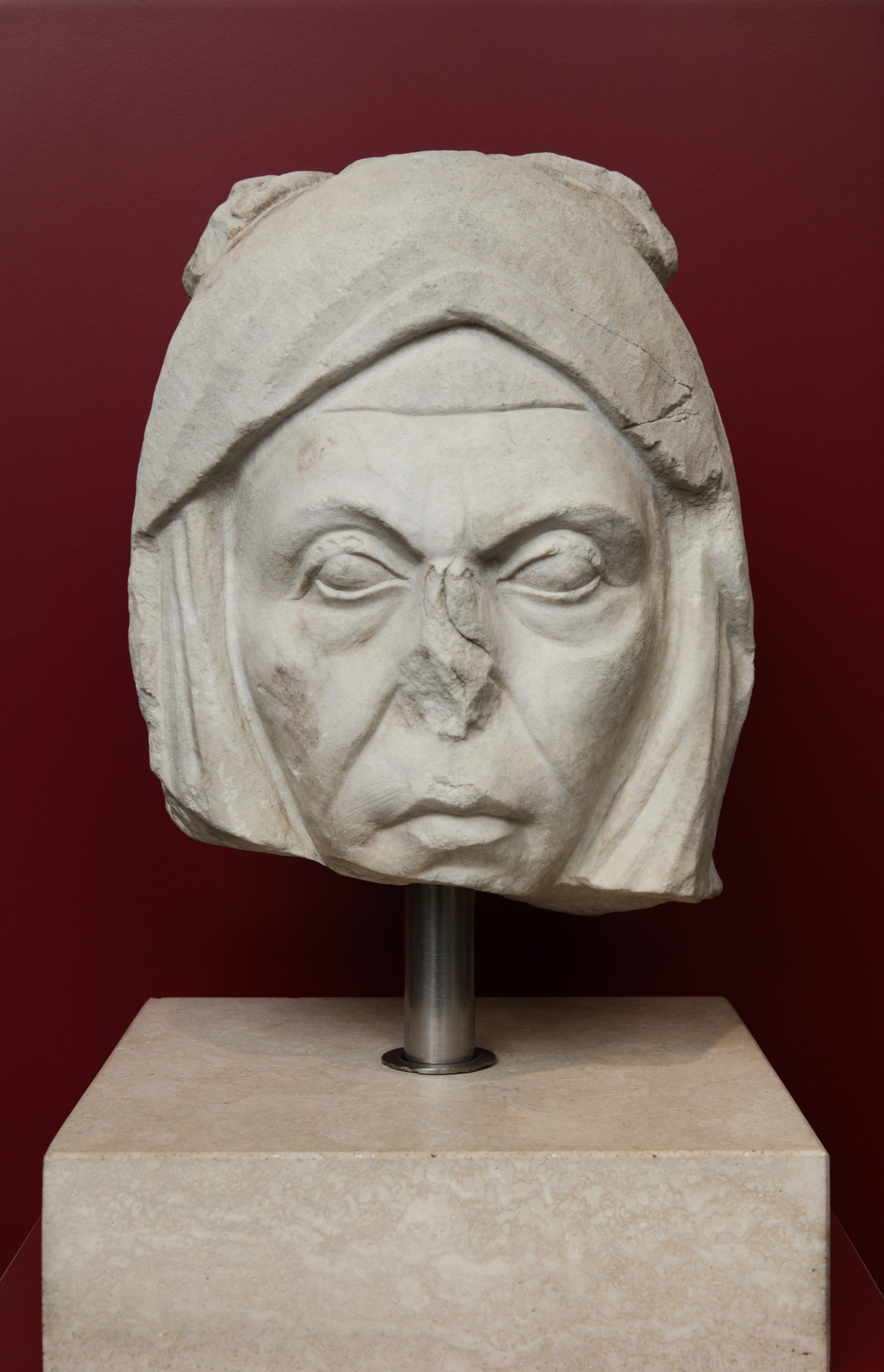
Portrait of an elderly woman

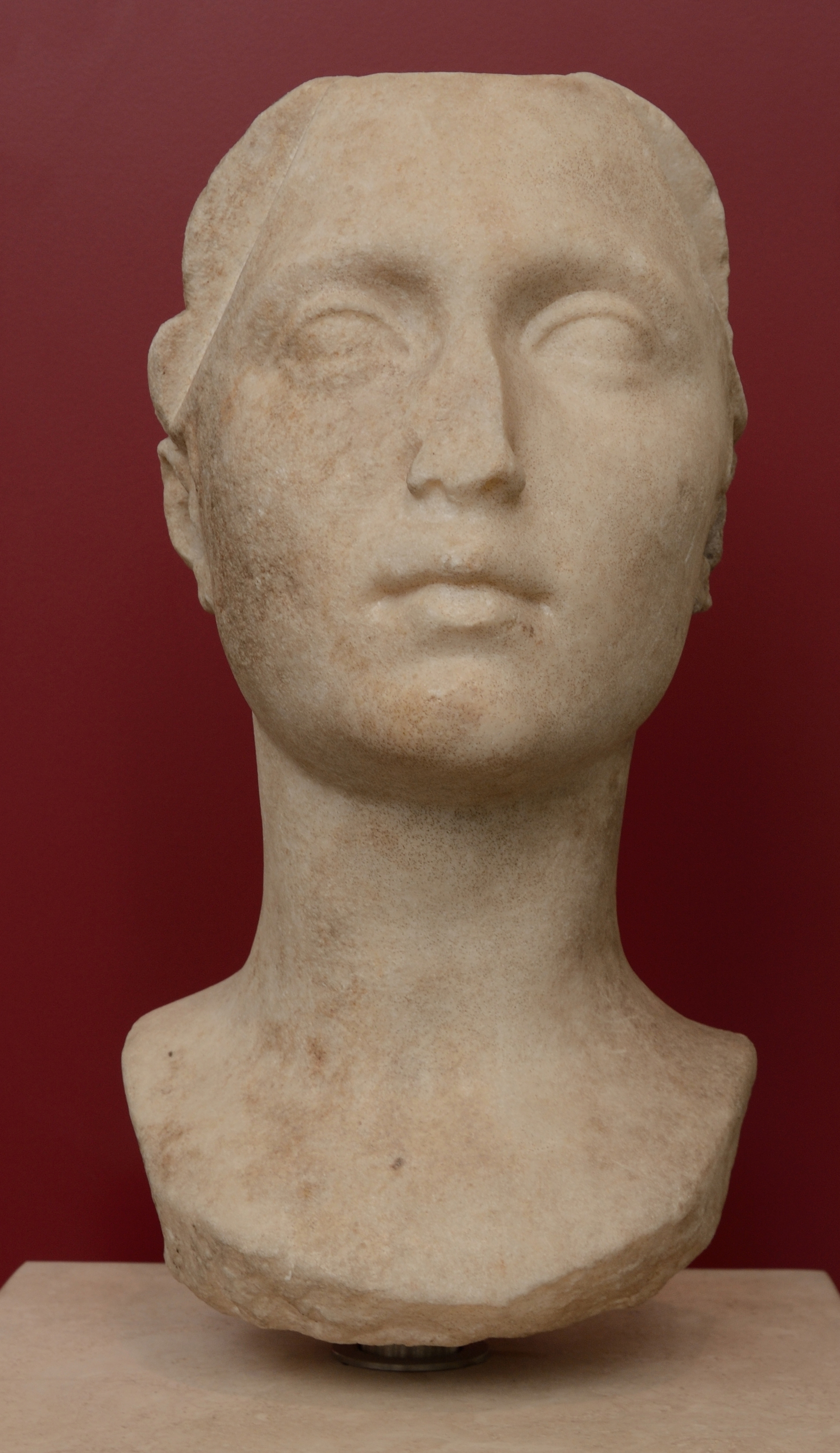
Portrait of a young woman

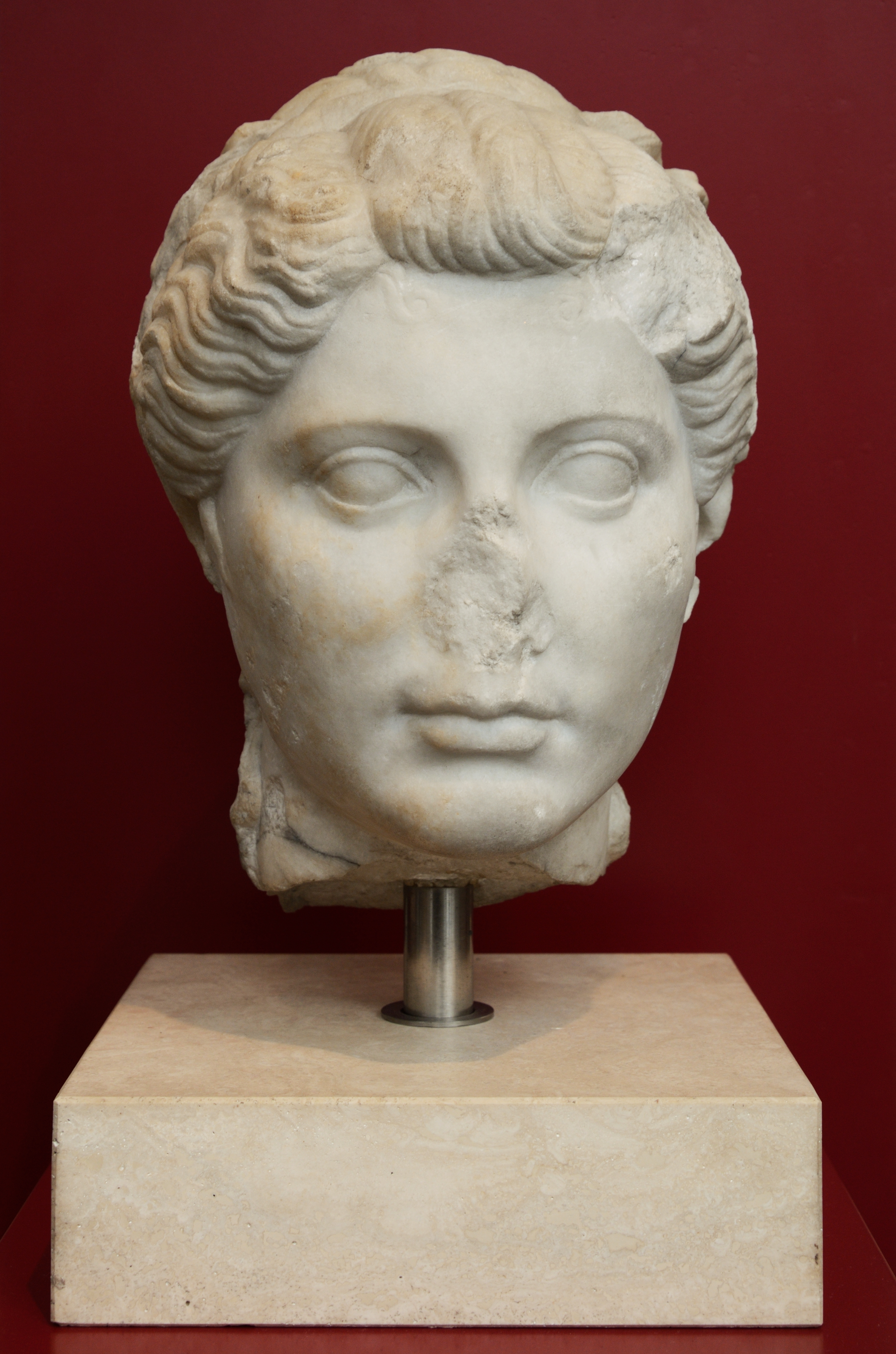
Portrait of a girl

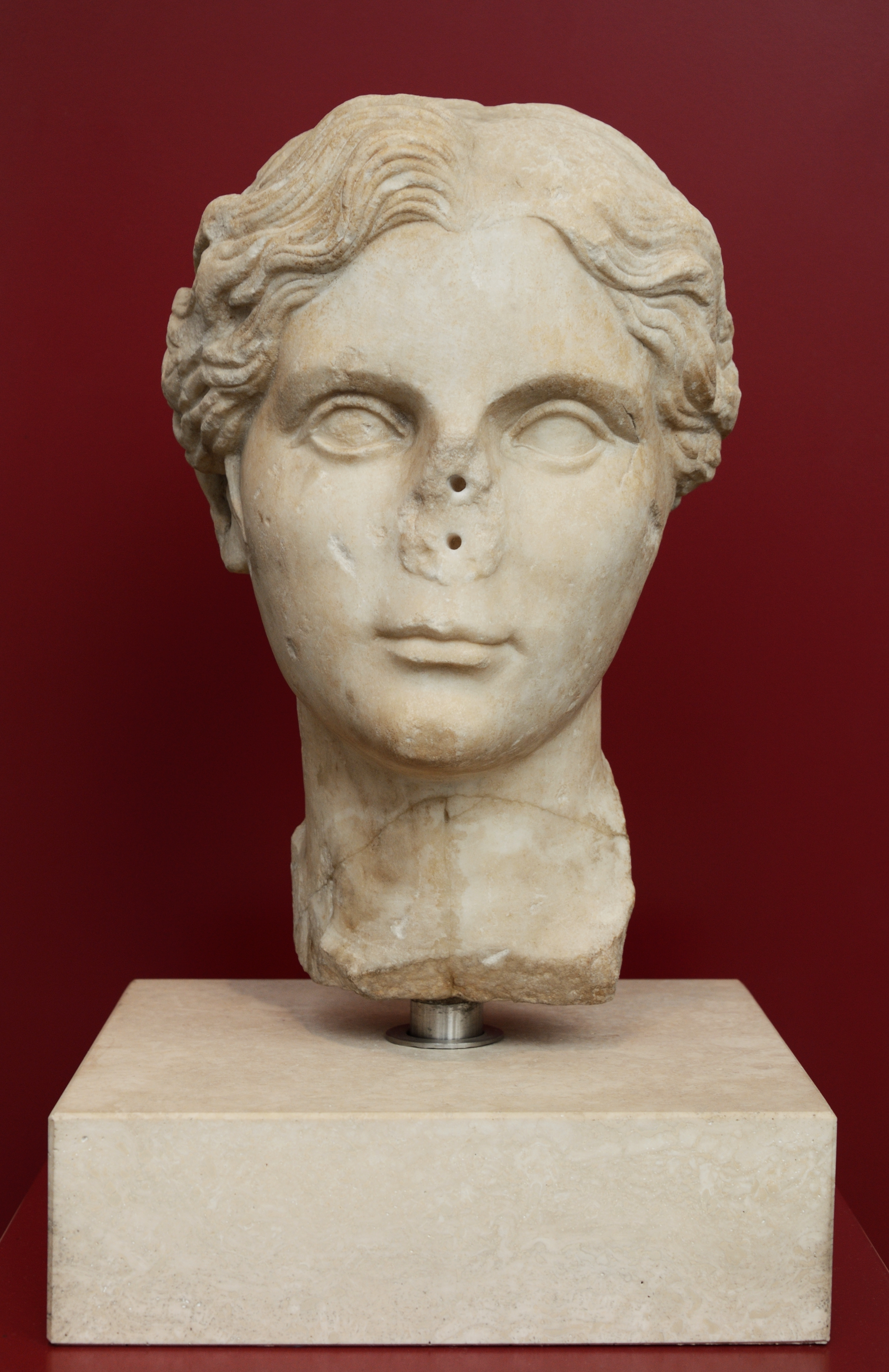
Portrait of a young woman

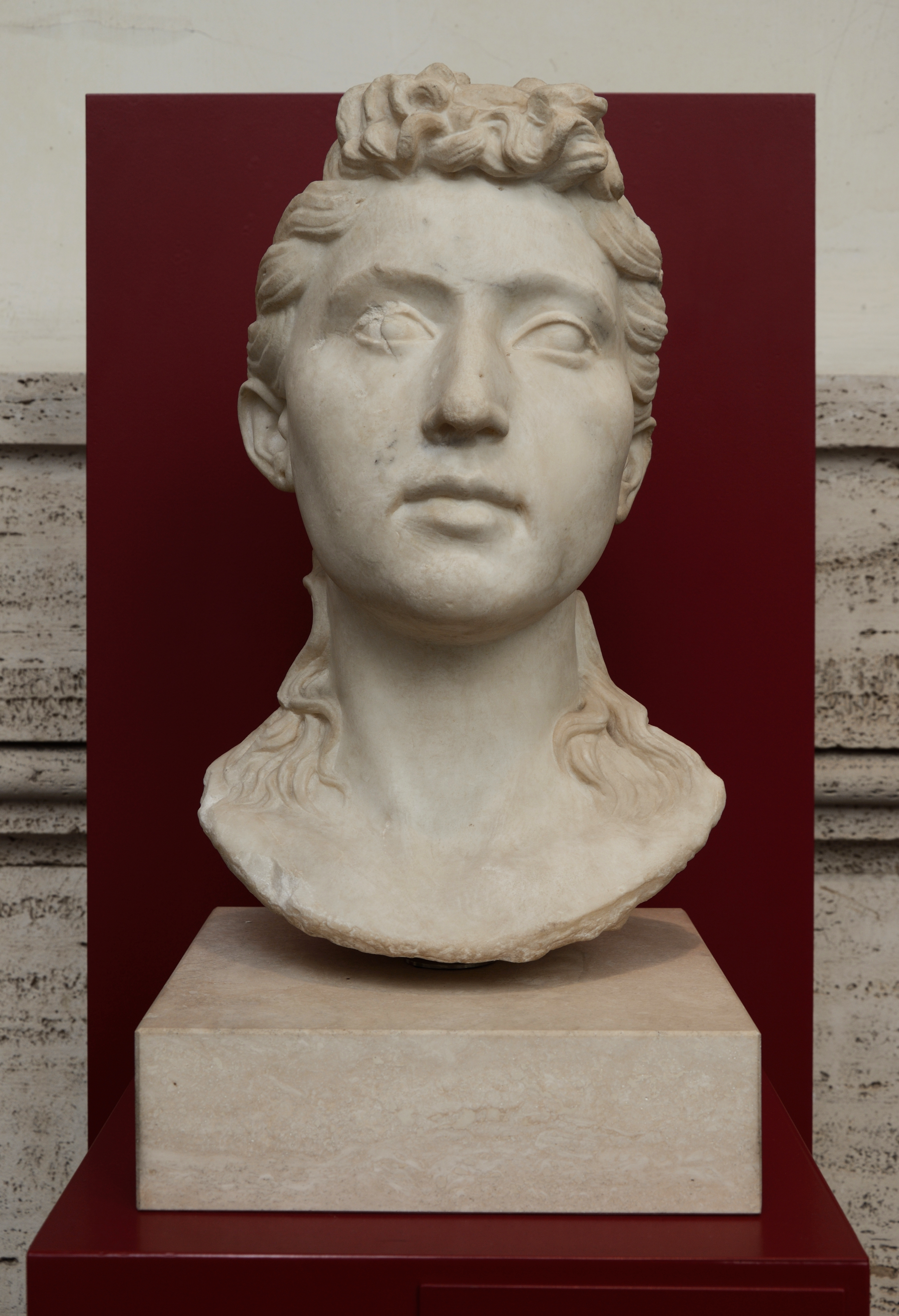
Portrait of a woman

Also in "Gallery I," one finds the center of a mosaic floor of a Roman villa (Tor Bella Monaca, Rome), which depicted an episode from the Argonauts myth, in which Hylas, the young companion of Hercules, draws water and a Nymph is about to drag him into the spring.

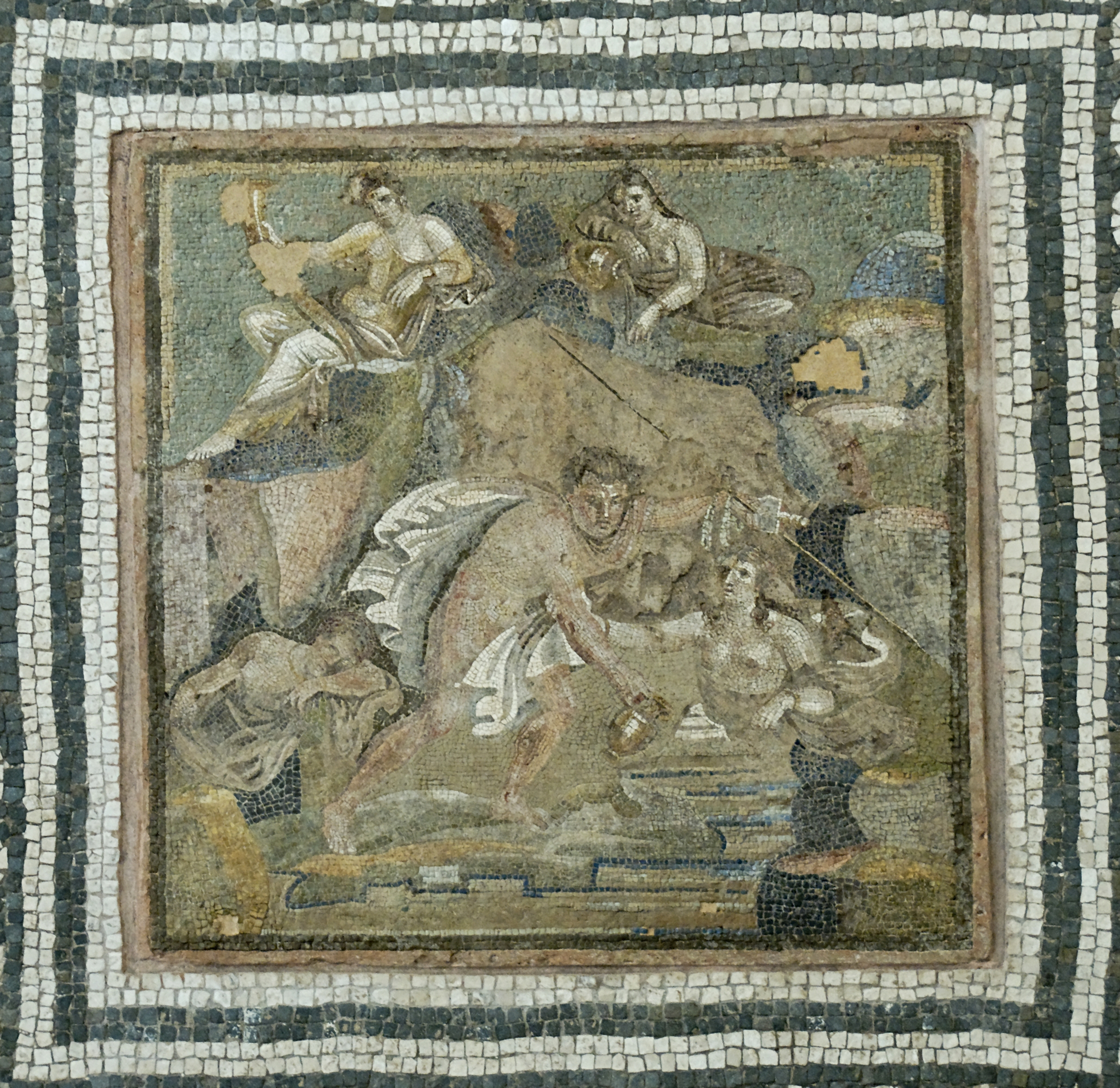
Central panel of the floor mosaic of a Roman villa, with Hylas and the nymphs (late 2nd century BC - early imperial period)

=== Room I (ground floor) ===
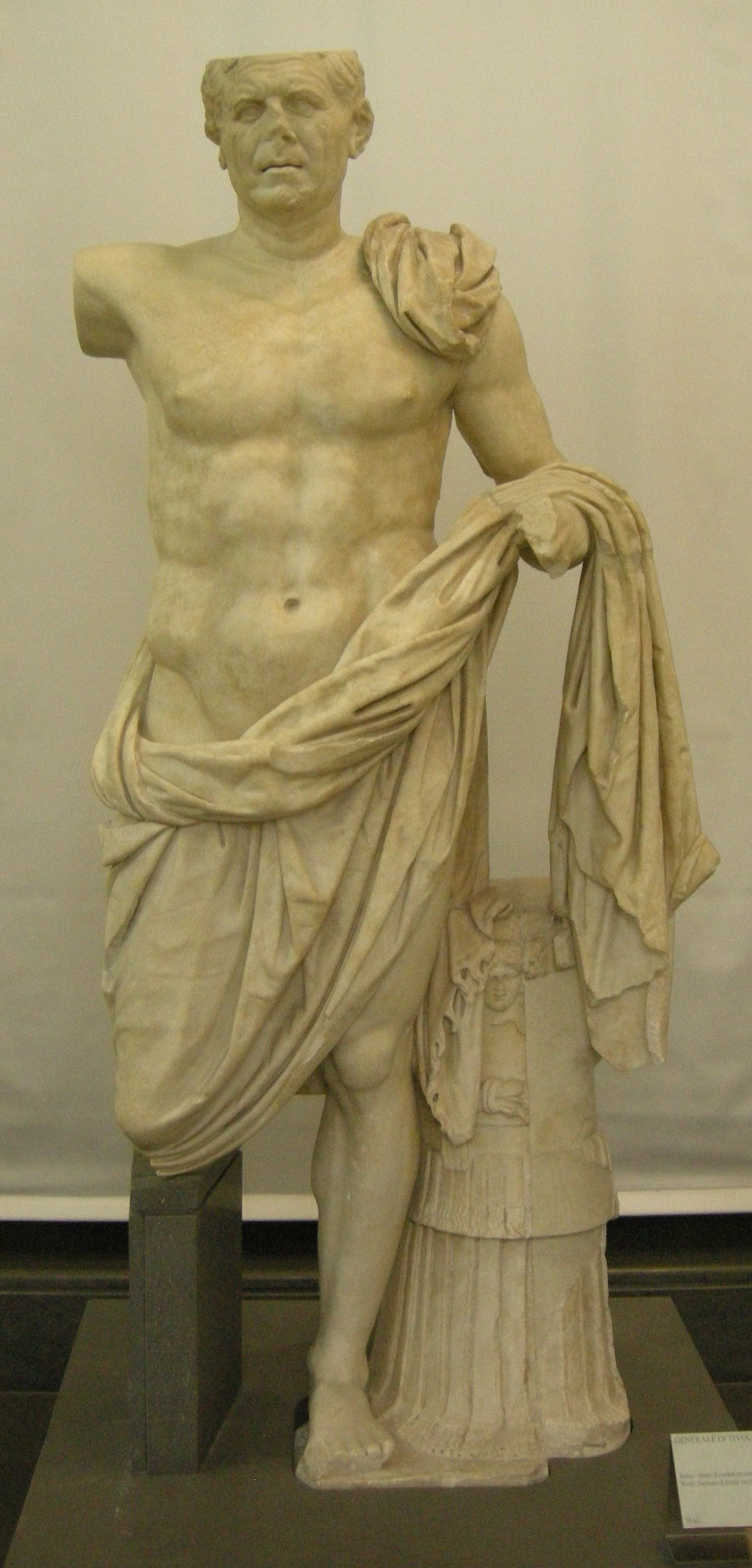
Statue of the so-called General of Tivoli

"Room I" contains a series of portraits of the ruling class (nobilitas) from the Republican period (prior to the Caesarian era). They follow two main trends: on the one hand those faithful to the realism of the Italic tradition, and on the other those that were influenced by Hellenism. Among the latter is the virile portrait from the Via Barberini in Rome and depicts a general of the first half/end of the second century BCE, identified by some scholars as Lucius Aemilius Paullus, the victor of Pydna (168 BCE), by others as Titus Quinctius Flamininus, the victor of Cynoscephalae. The masterpiece of late republican portraiture is the statue of the so-called "General of Tivoli" (from the sanctuary of Hercules the Victor, from the beginning of the first century BCE). The portrait is among those faithful to the realism of the Italic tradition.

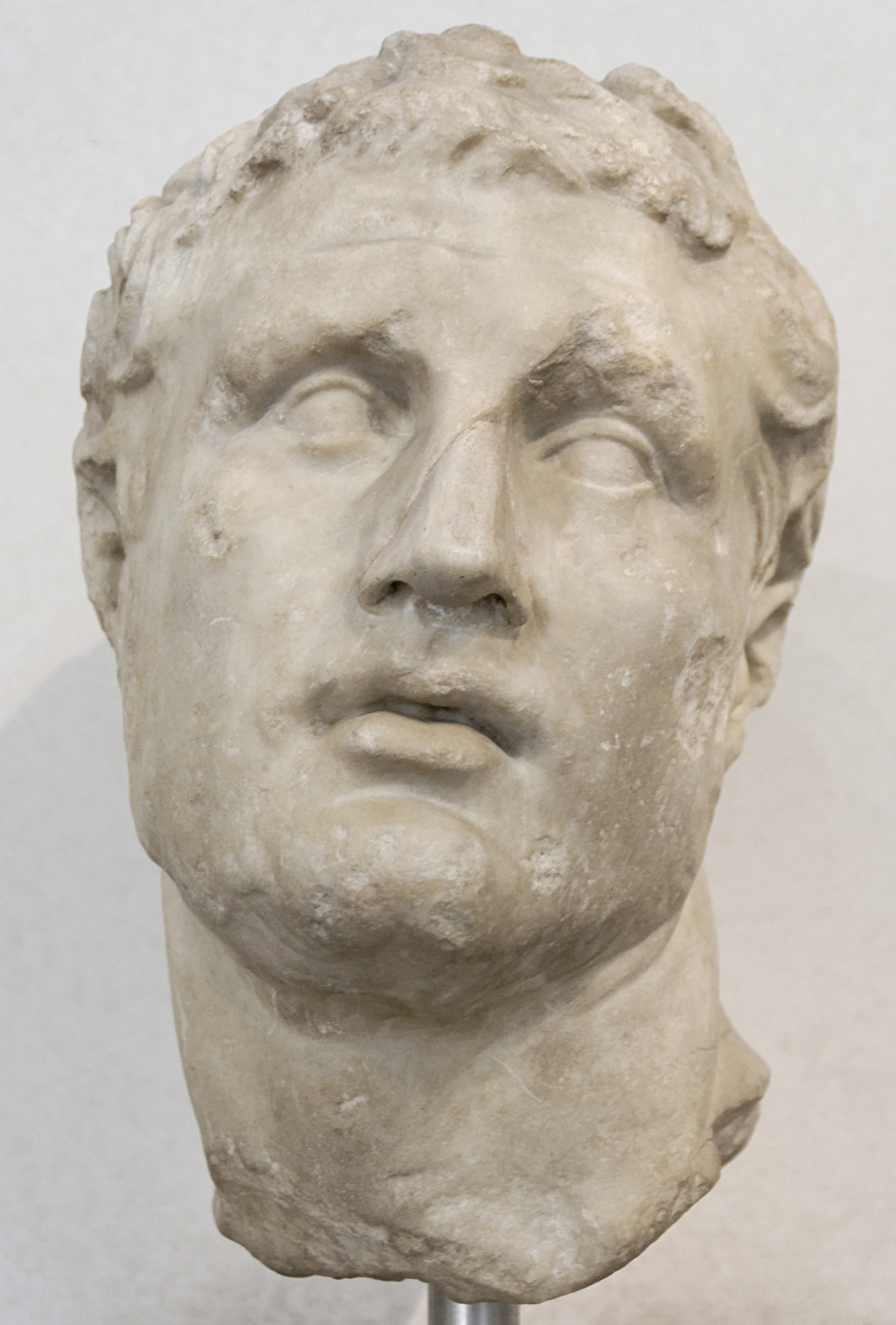
Male portrait in Hellenistic style that some scholars have identified as Aemilius Paulus, others as Flaminius.

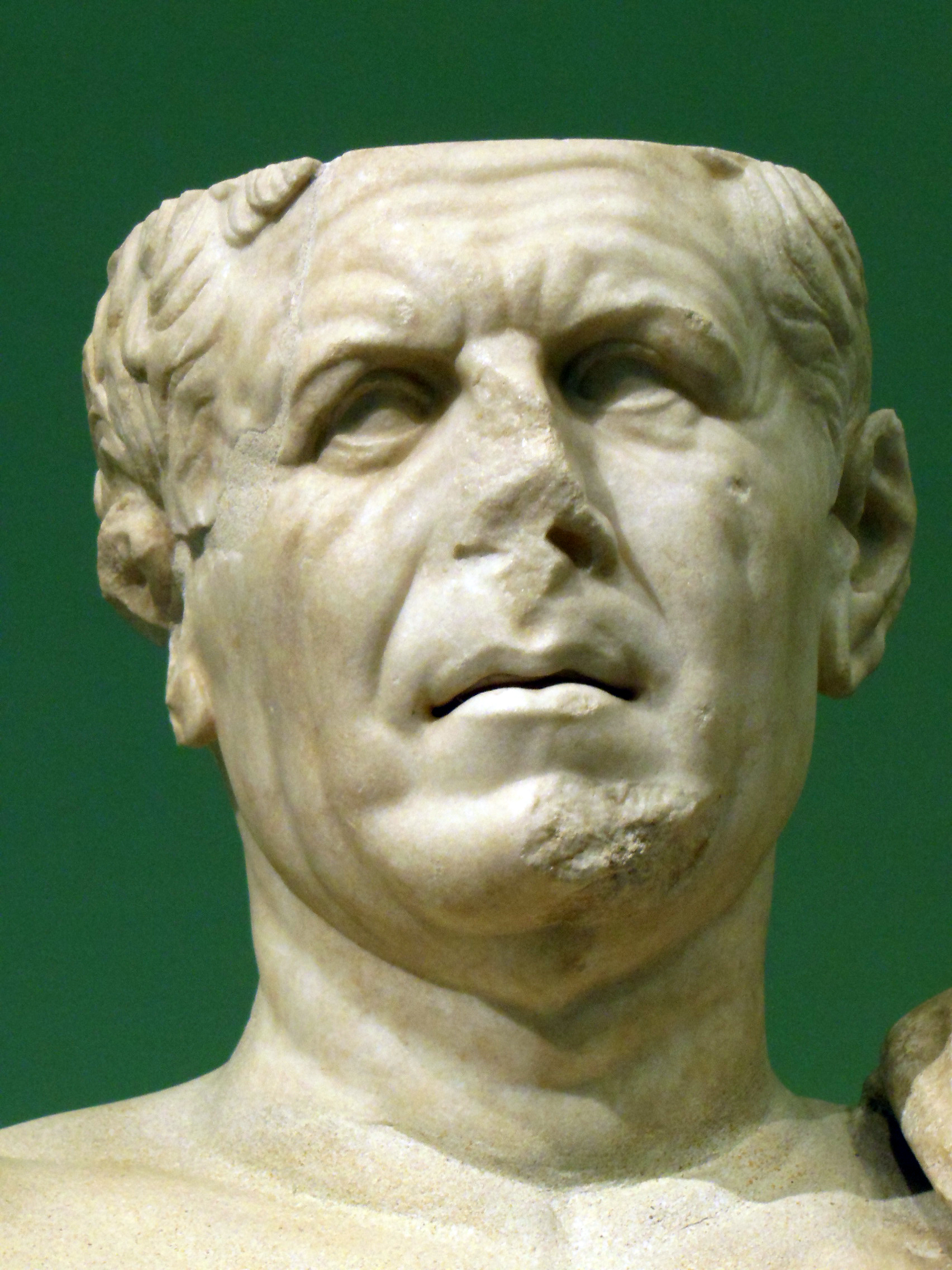
The "General of Tivoli" (detail of the head)

This room also contains the Fasti Antiates, i.e., two frescoed panels found near Nero's Villa at Anzio, dating to the period 88 to 55 BCE and containing the Roman calendar of Numa Pompilius, which preceded the reform of Gaius Julius Caesar, including Roman festivals and a list of the main magistracies, such as that of consuls and censors from the period 173 to 67 BCE.

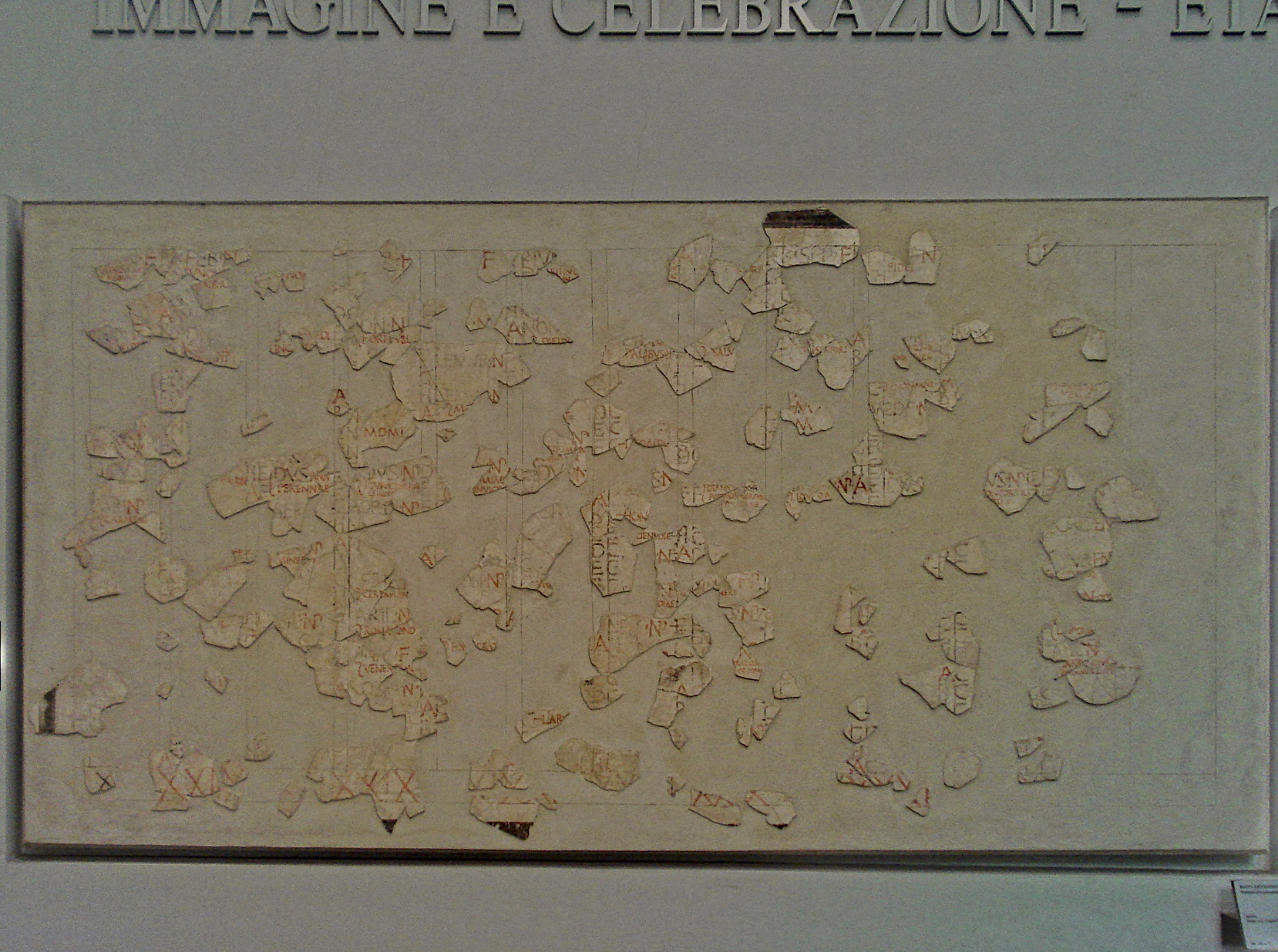
Fasti Antiates

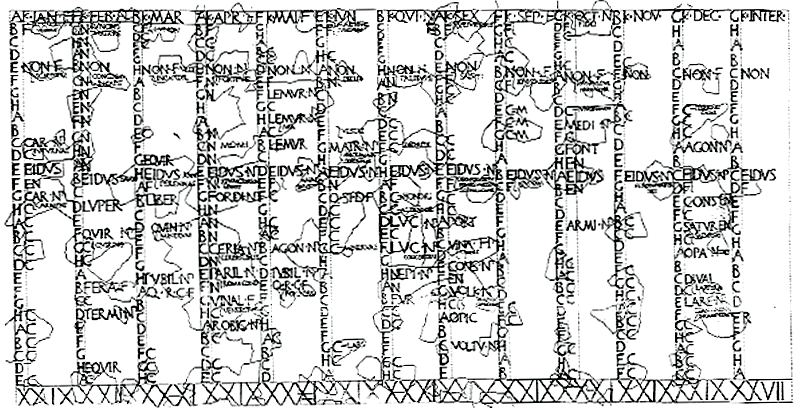
Reconstruction of the Fasti Antiates

=== Room II (ground floor) ===
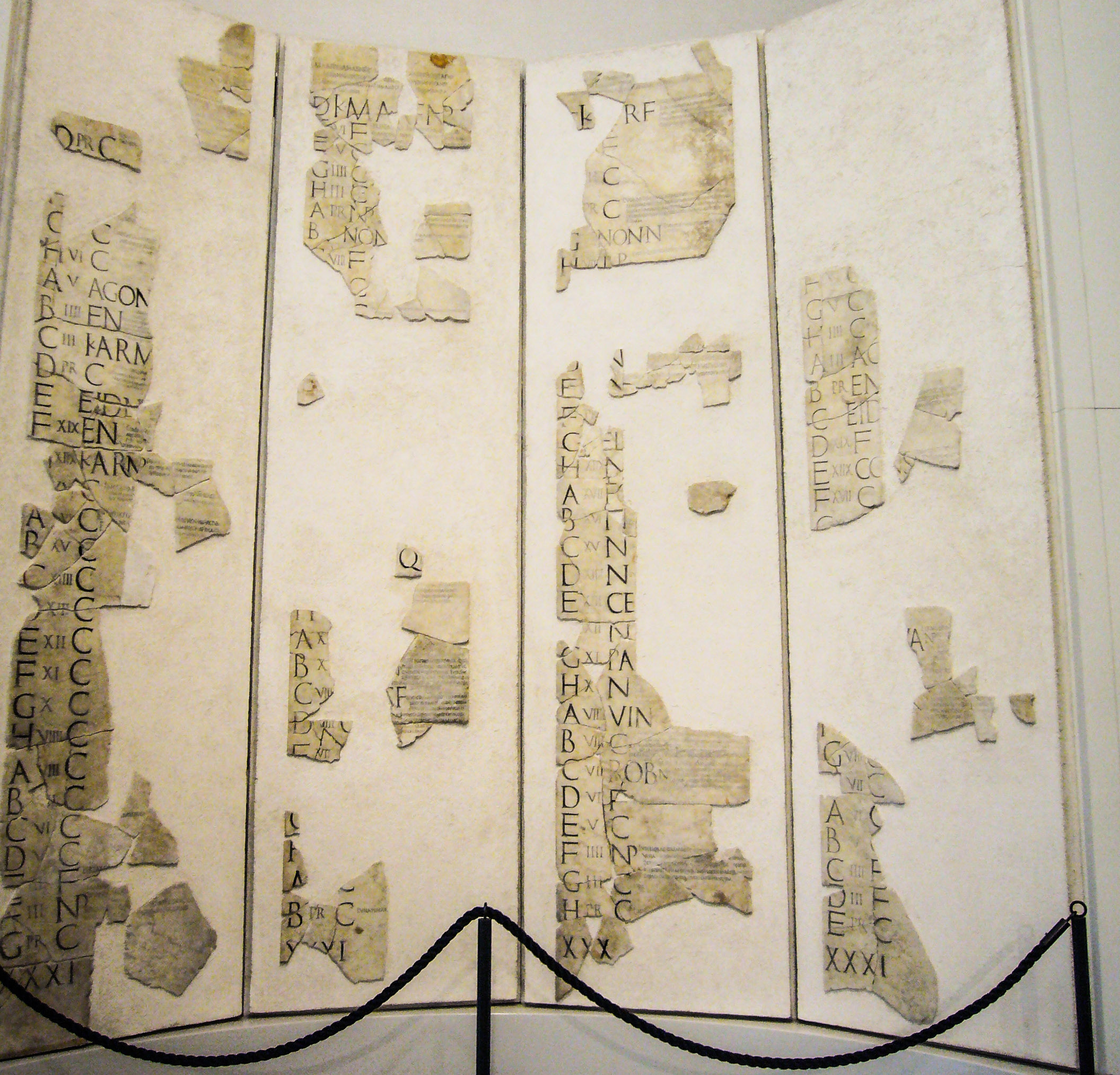
The Fasti Prenestini (discovered in 1907 in Palestrina), Verrius Flaccus' calendar of the years 6-9 AD.

In "Room II," the exhibition continues chronologically and shows images between the Caesarian and Augustan ages, when alongside the realist tendencies are found the new classicist one, especially sought by Octavian Augustus.

Also included in the "room" is a togated funerary stele, in which the representation of a ring in the left hand probably indicates membership in the equestrian order. This kind of funerary relief was also used by the freedmen, a now emerging class. The funerary relief of the Rabirii, which came from the Appian Way, shows three figures, including a pair of freedmen (Caius Rabirius Hermodorus and Rabiria Demaris), related to their patron, a certain Gaius Rabirius Postumus, a knight of the Caesarian age, defended by Cicero in his work Pro Rabirius Postumus. The third figure portrays a certain Usia Prima (who may represent a descendant of the couple and was added in the first century CE) and depicts her as a priestess of Isis.

Also in this room can be found epigraphic fragments of a calendar, the Fasti Praenestini, affixed in Praeneste, and illustrating an Augustan-era calendar in which Caesar's reform of the 365-day year had by then taken effect.

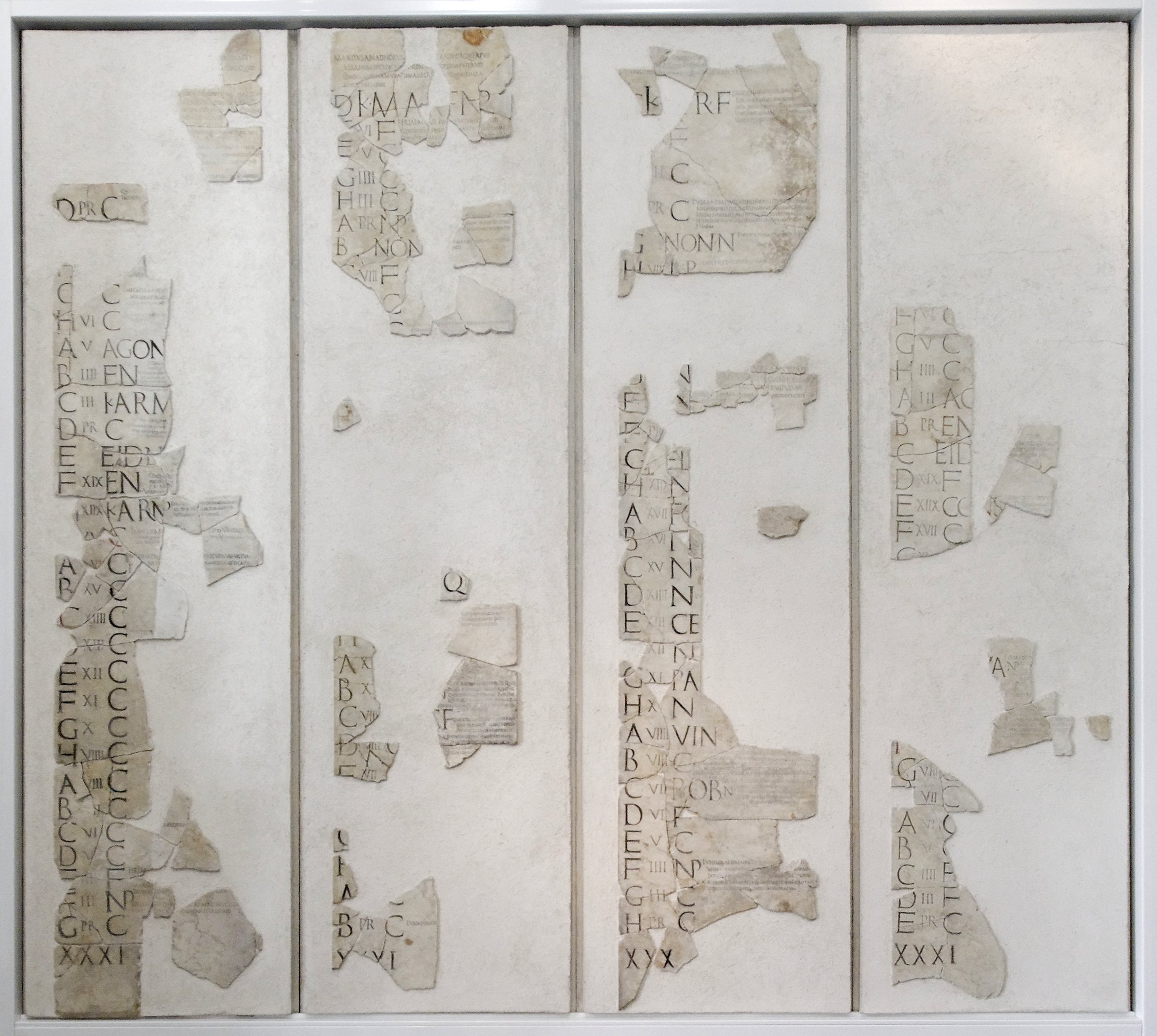
Fasti Prenestini

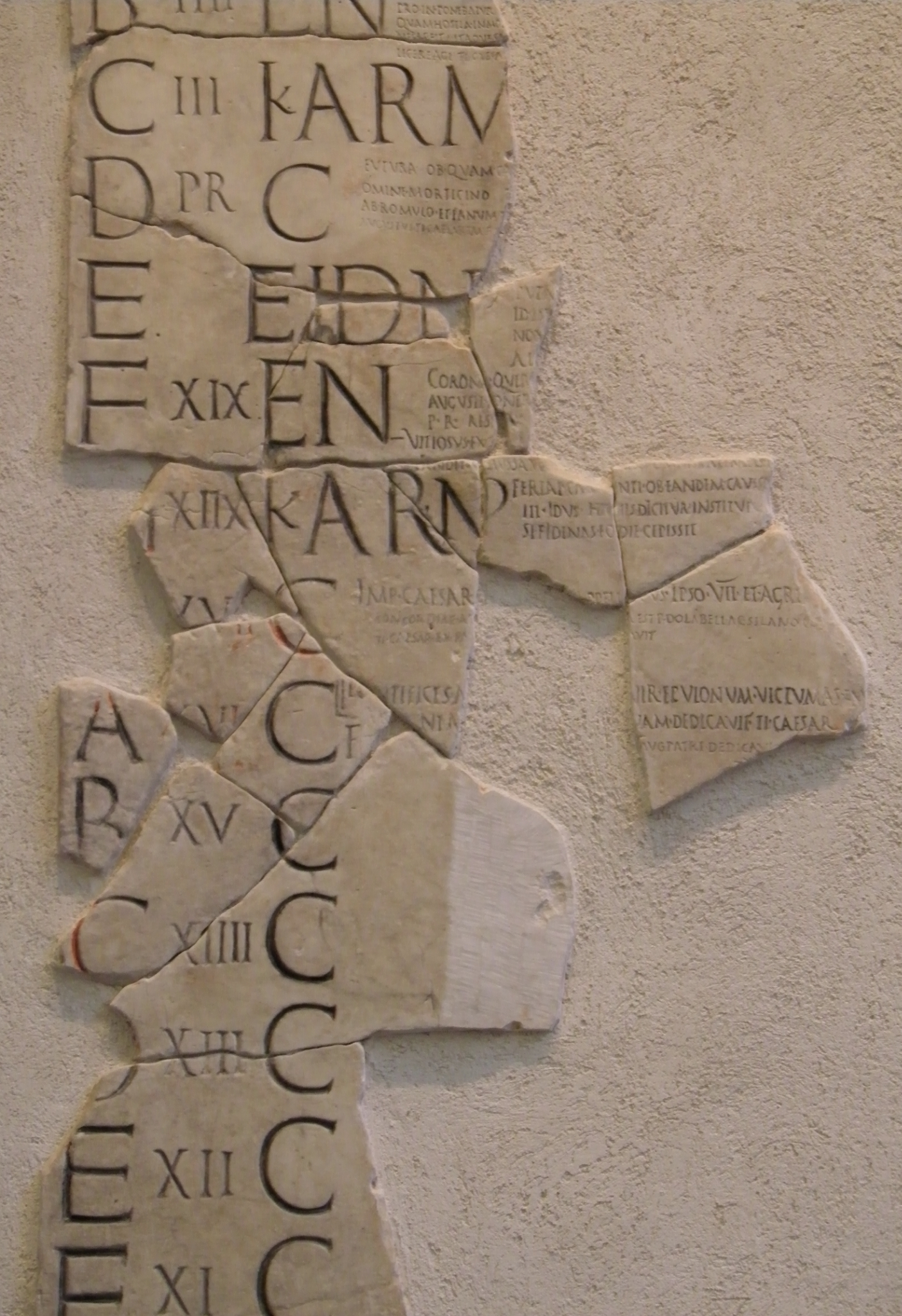
Detail of the Fasti Prenestini

=== Gallery II (ground floor) ===
On display in "Gallery II" are a loricate acephalous statue (in military garb) from the Antonine age and two altars dedicated to imperial worship.

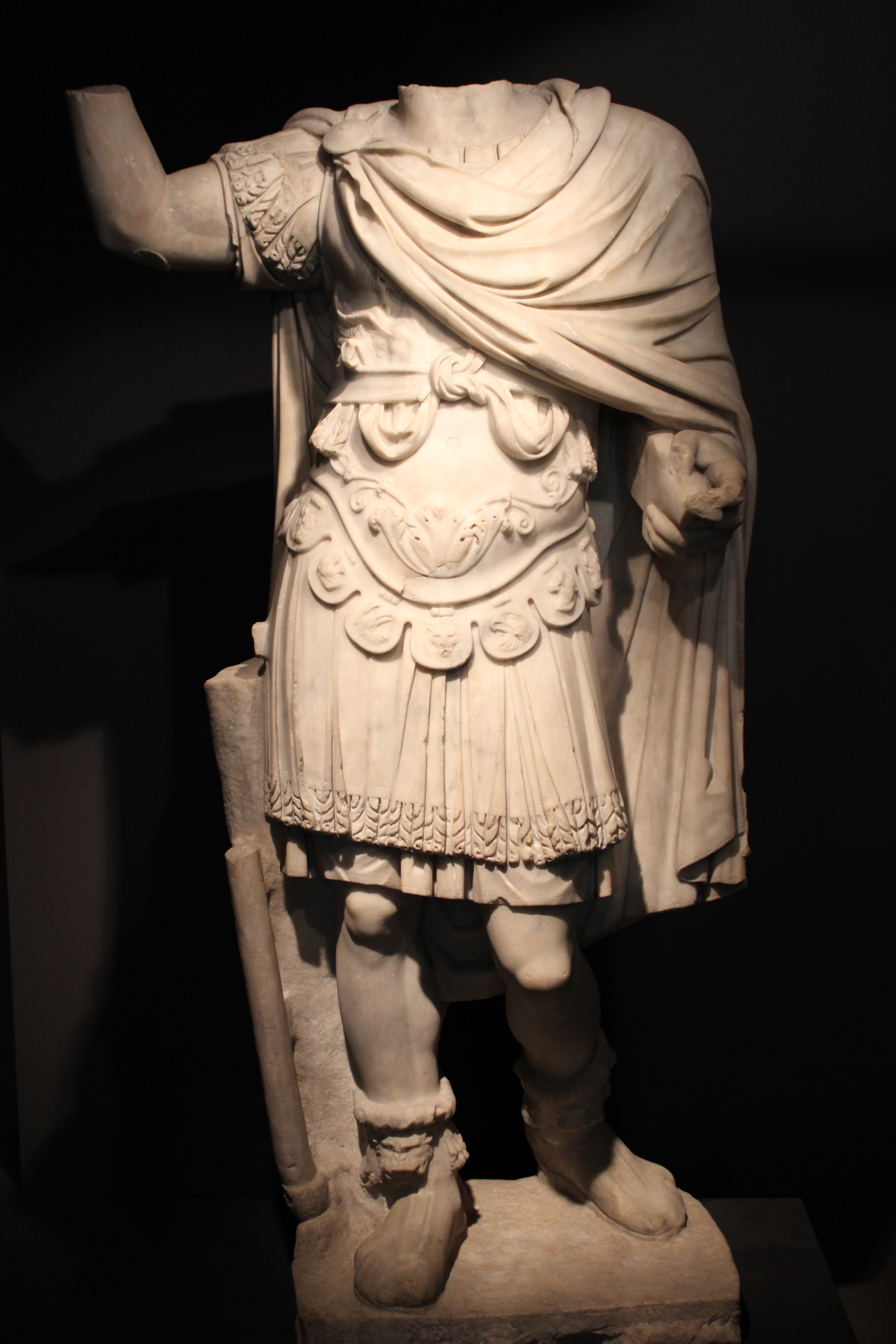
Loricated acephalous statue of the Antonine period

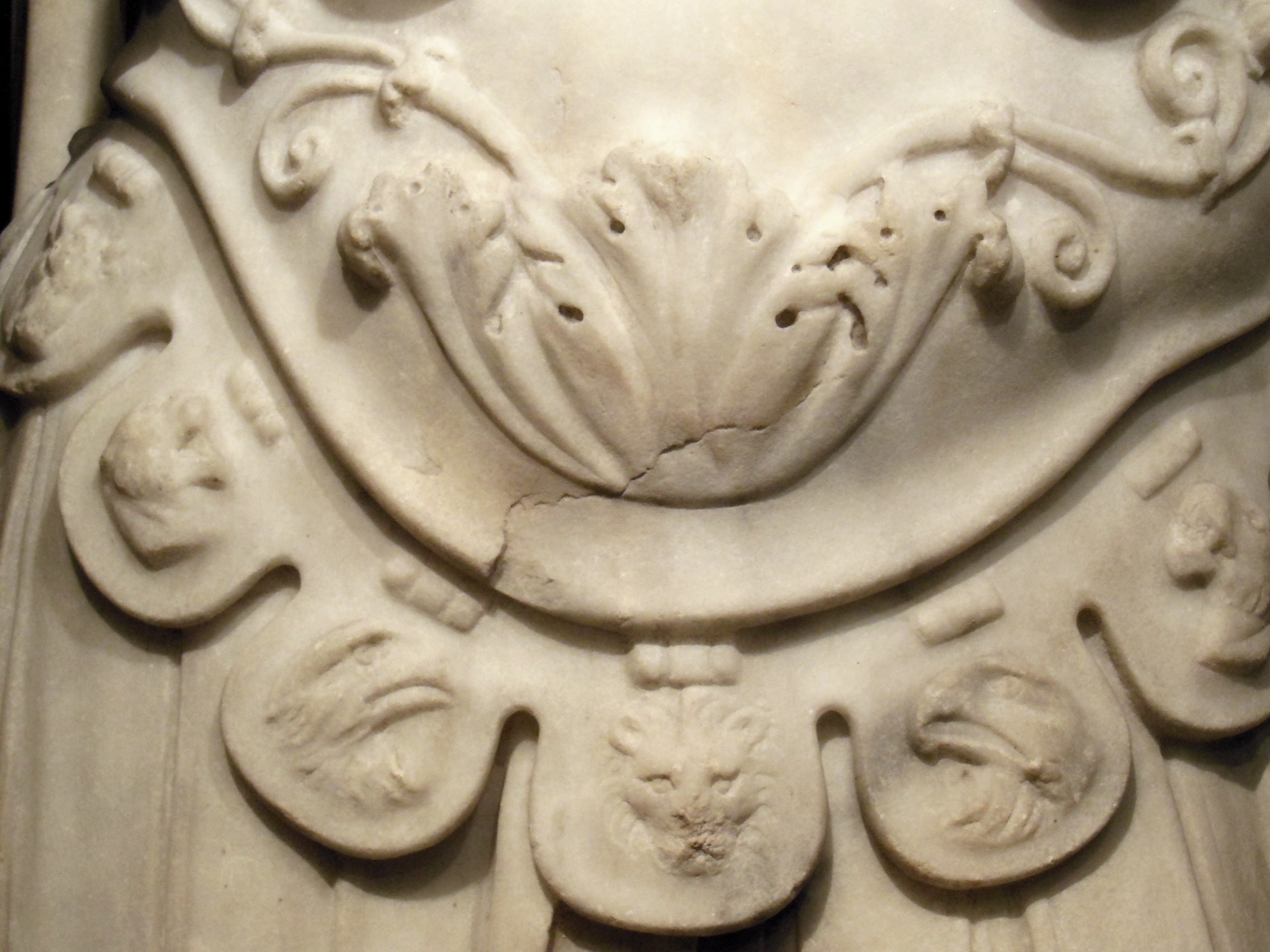
Detail of the loricate statue

=== Room III (ground floor) ===
The room is temporarily being refurbished.

=== Room IV (ground floor) ===
"Room IV" collects a series of marble and bronze portraits during the period of the Julio-Claudian dynasty, starting with the realistic portrait of Gaius Octavius, father of Octavian Augustus, as well as the latter's youthful portrait, which is influenced by Hellenistic sculpture. There are also a series of classicistic portraits of his possible heirs (from Drusus the Elder, to Germanicus Julius Caesar), to his royal successors (Tiberius and Caligula).

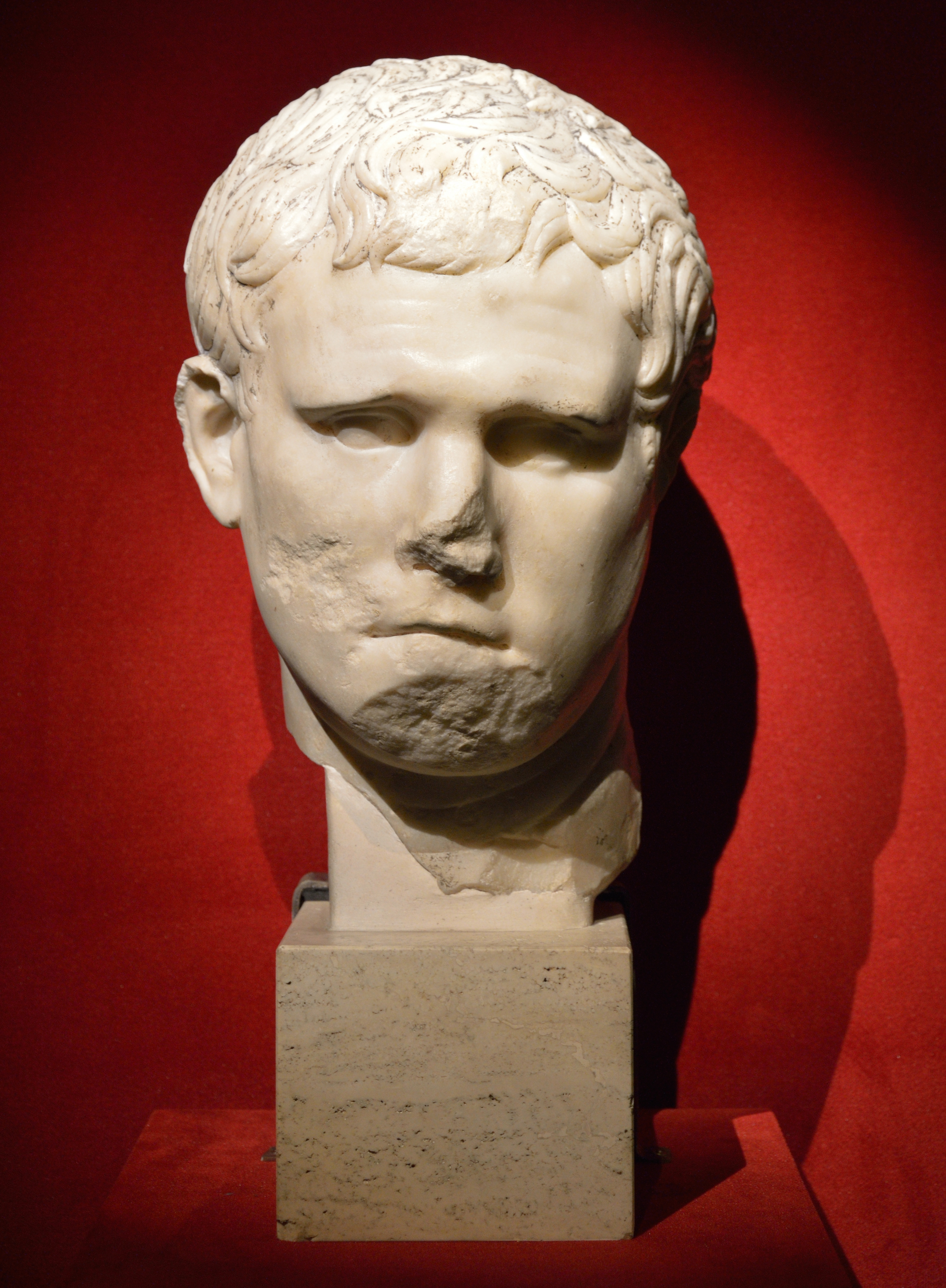
Marcus Vipsanius Agrippa (63 - 12 B.C.), right-hand man of Octavian Augustus and his son-in-law

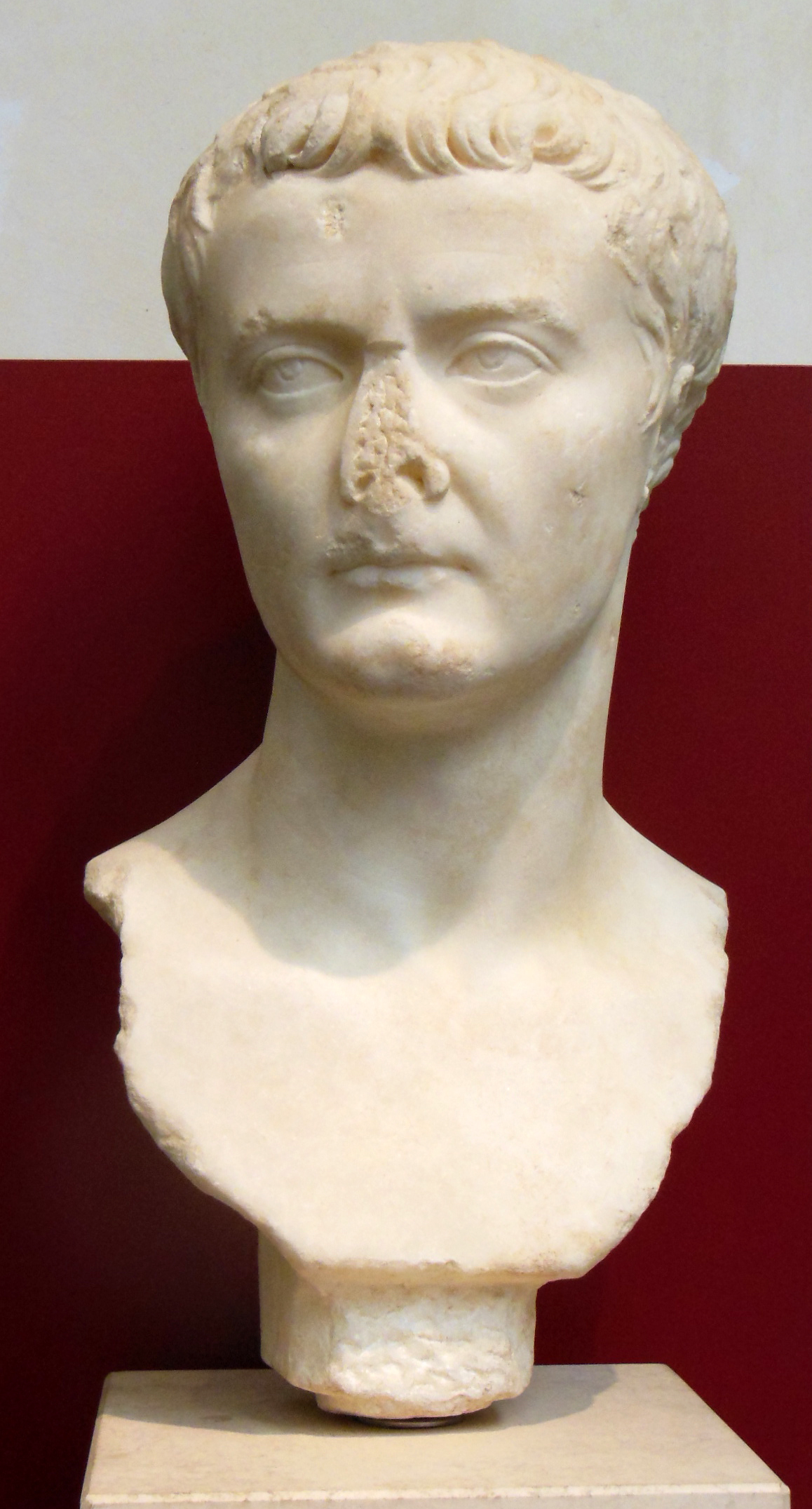
A young Tiberius (42 BC - 37 AD).

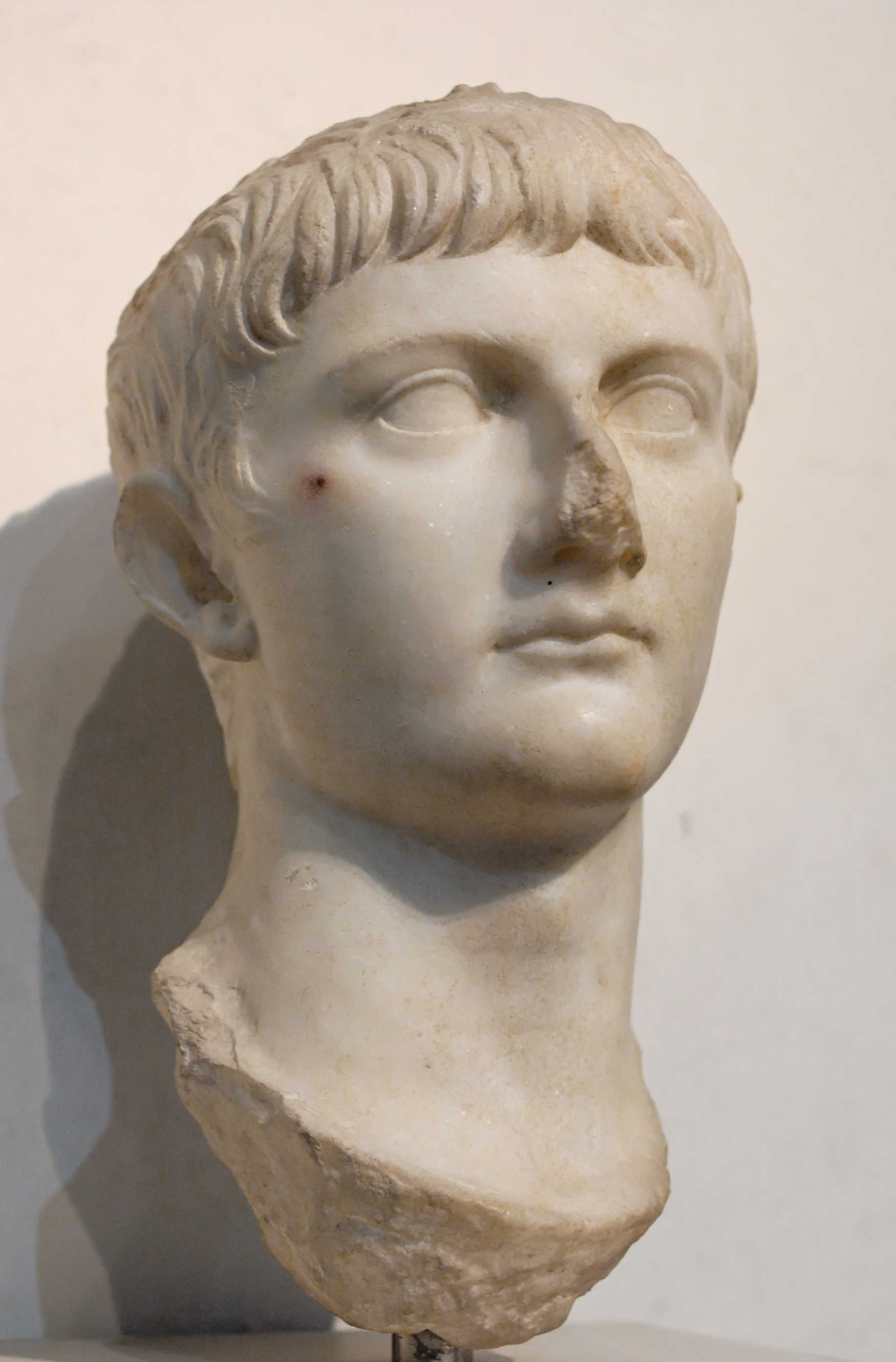
Germanicus Julius Caesar (15 B.C.-A.D. 19), designated heir of Tiberius

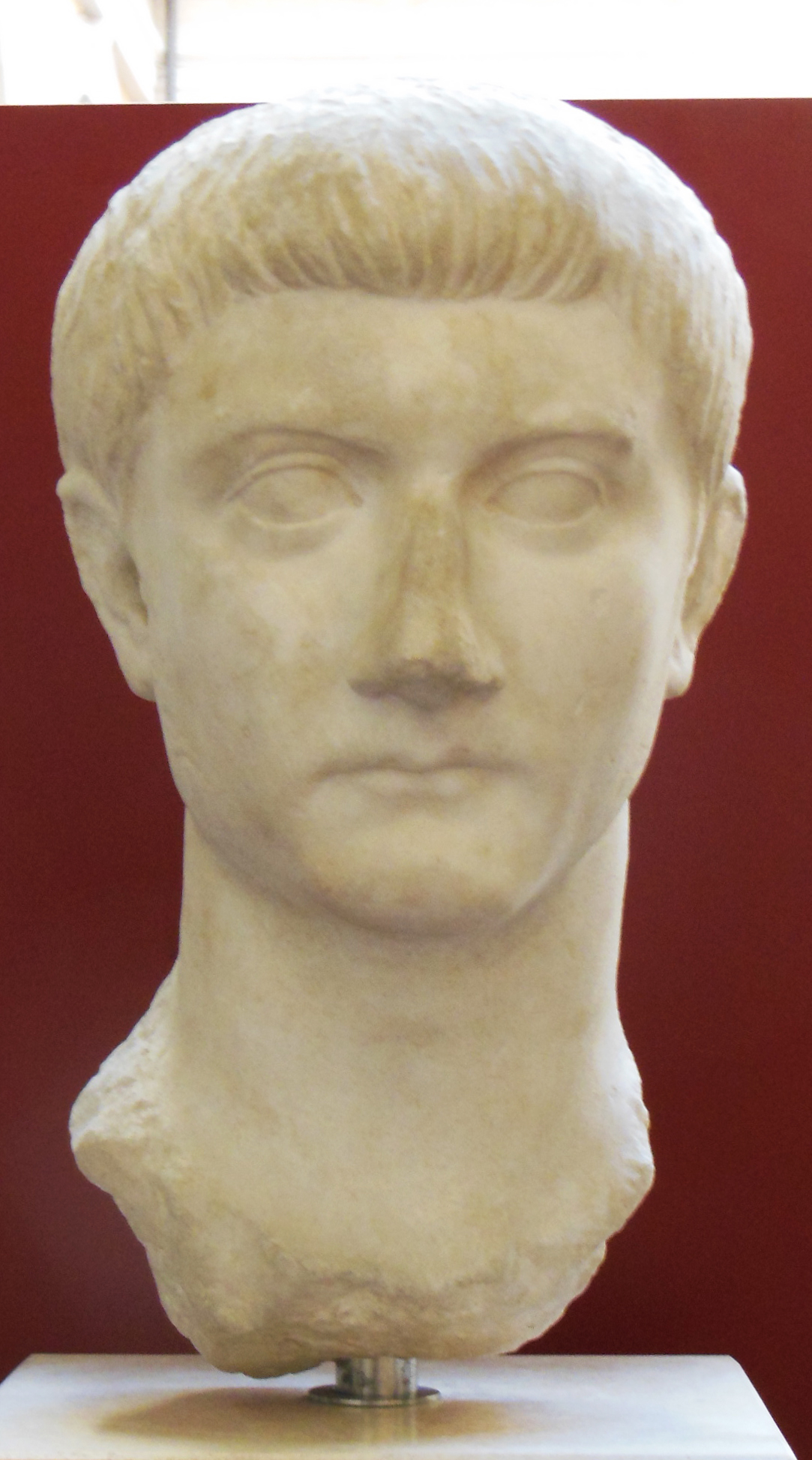
Drusus the Younger (13 B.C. - 23 A.D.), son of Tiberius

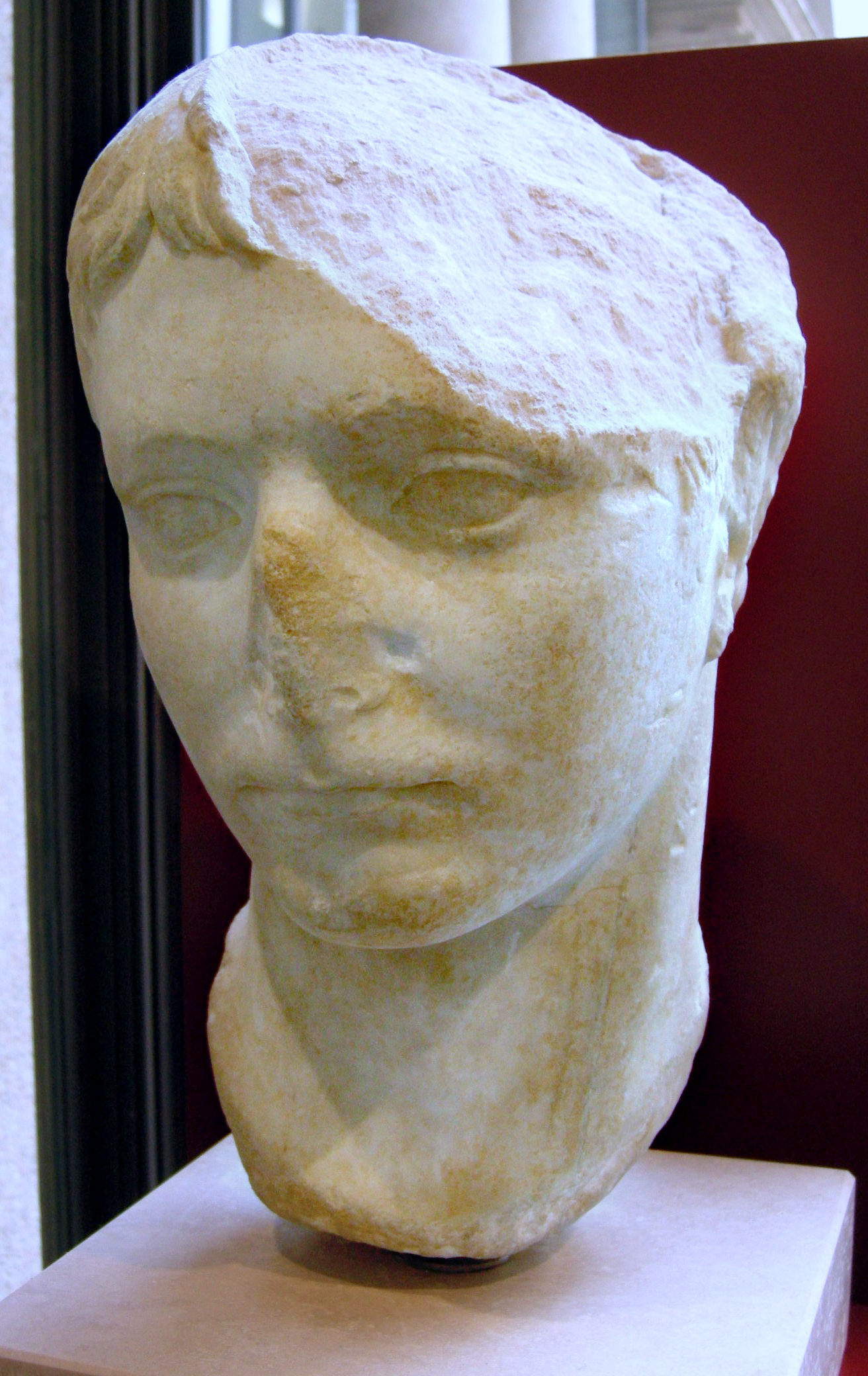
Marcus Vipsanius Agrippa Postumus (12 B.C.-A.D. 14), son of Agrippa and Julia (daughter of Augustus)

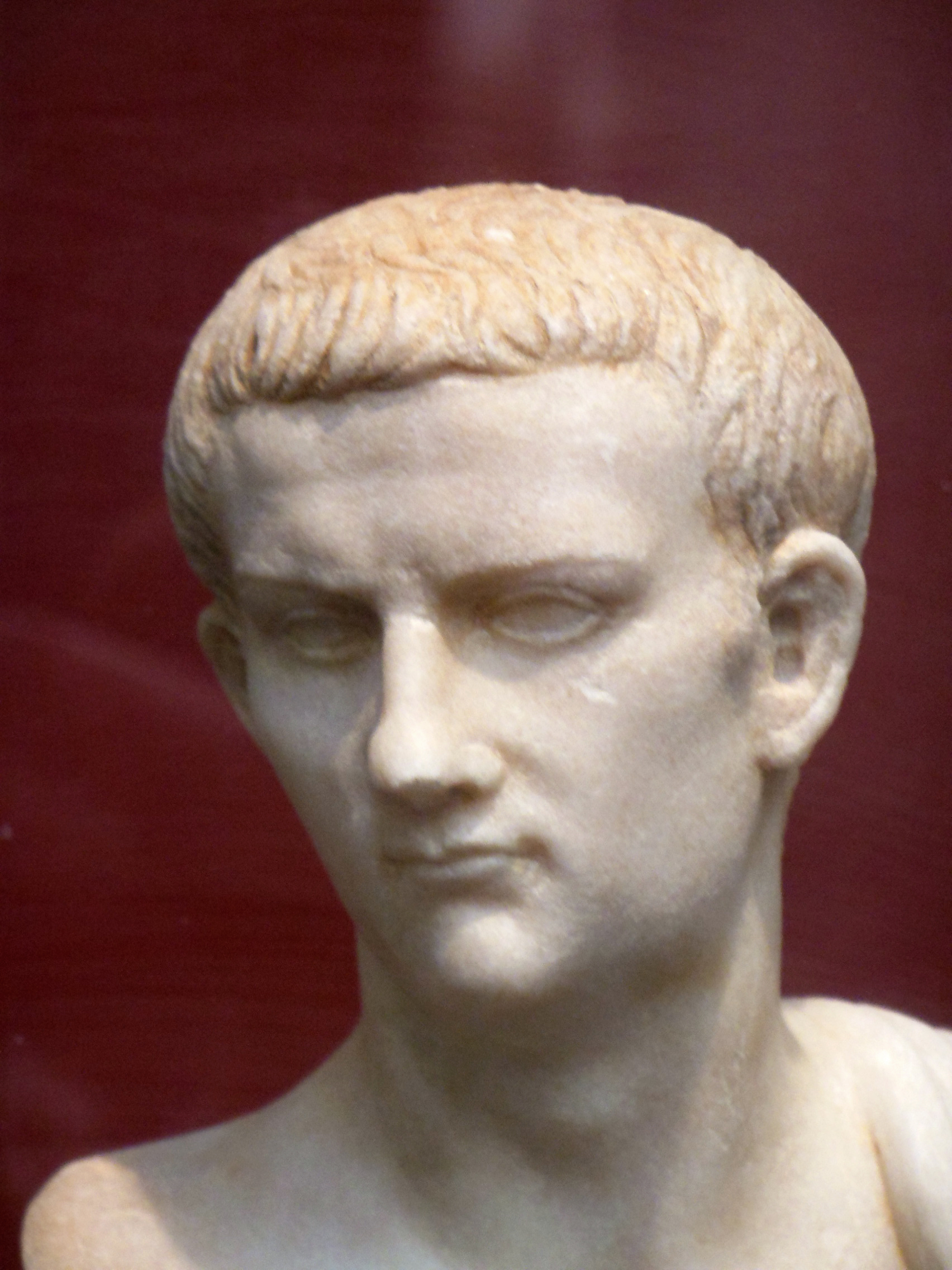
Caligula (12 - 41 d.C.)

The image of the imperial family also profoundly influenced that of private citizens, whose statues adopted not only the same hairstyles as the various princepes, but also the same physiognomies. Women's fashion of that period was also dictated by the princesses of the dynasty, such as Octavia (Octavian's sister), Livia, Antonia and the two Agrippines.

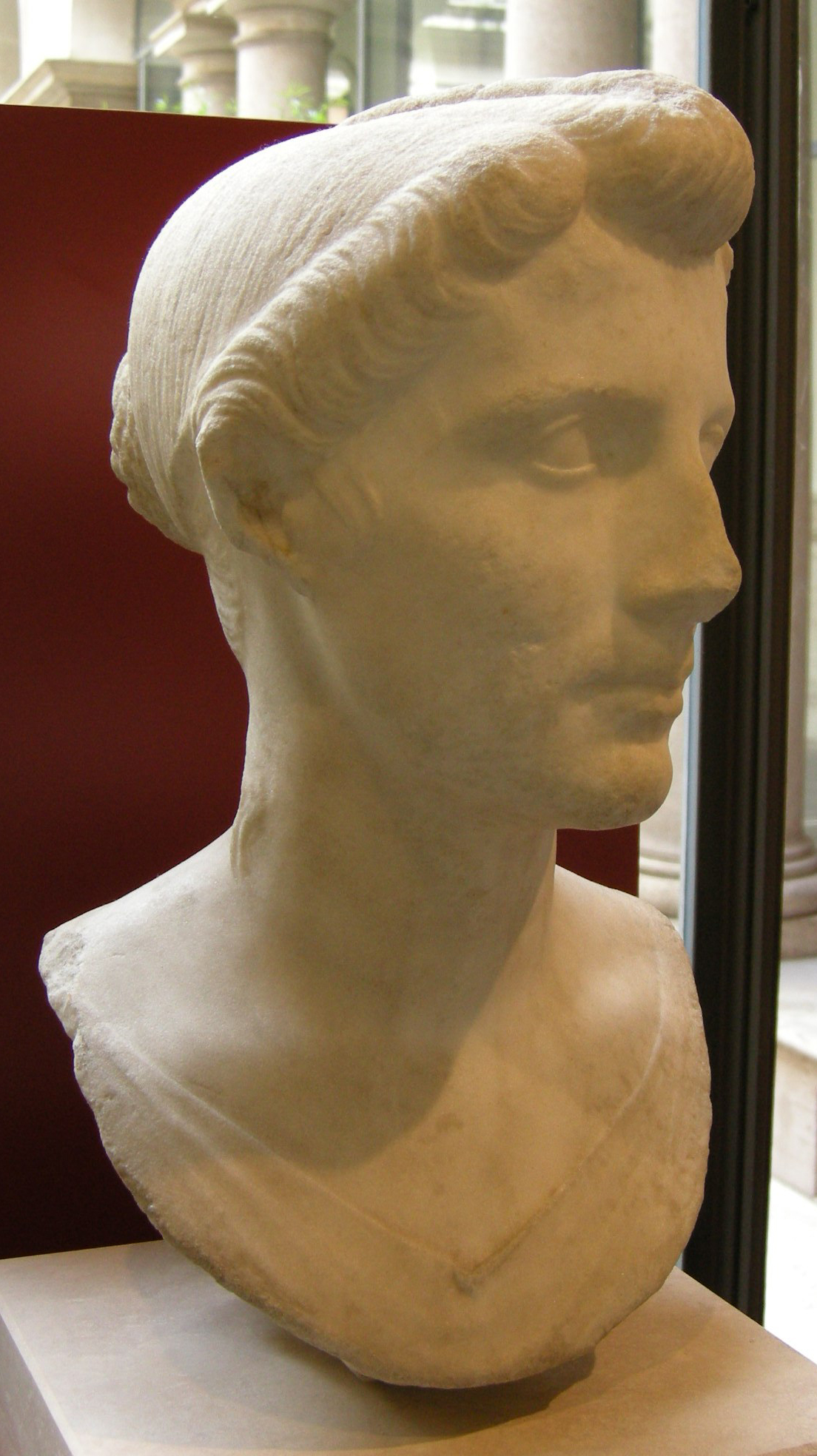
Octavia the Younger (69 - 11 B.C.)

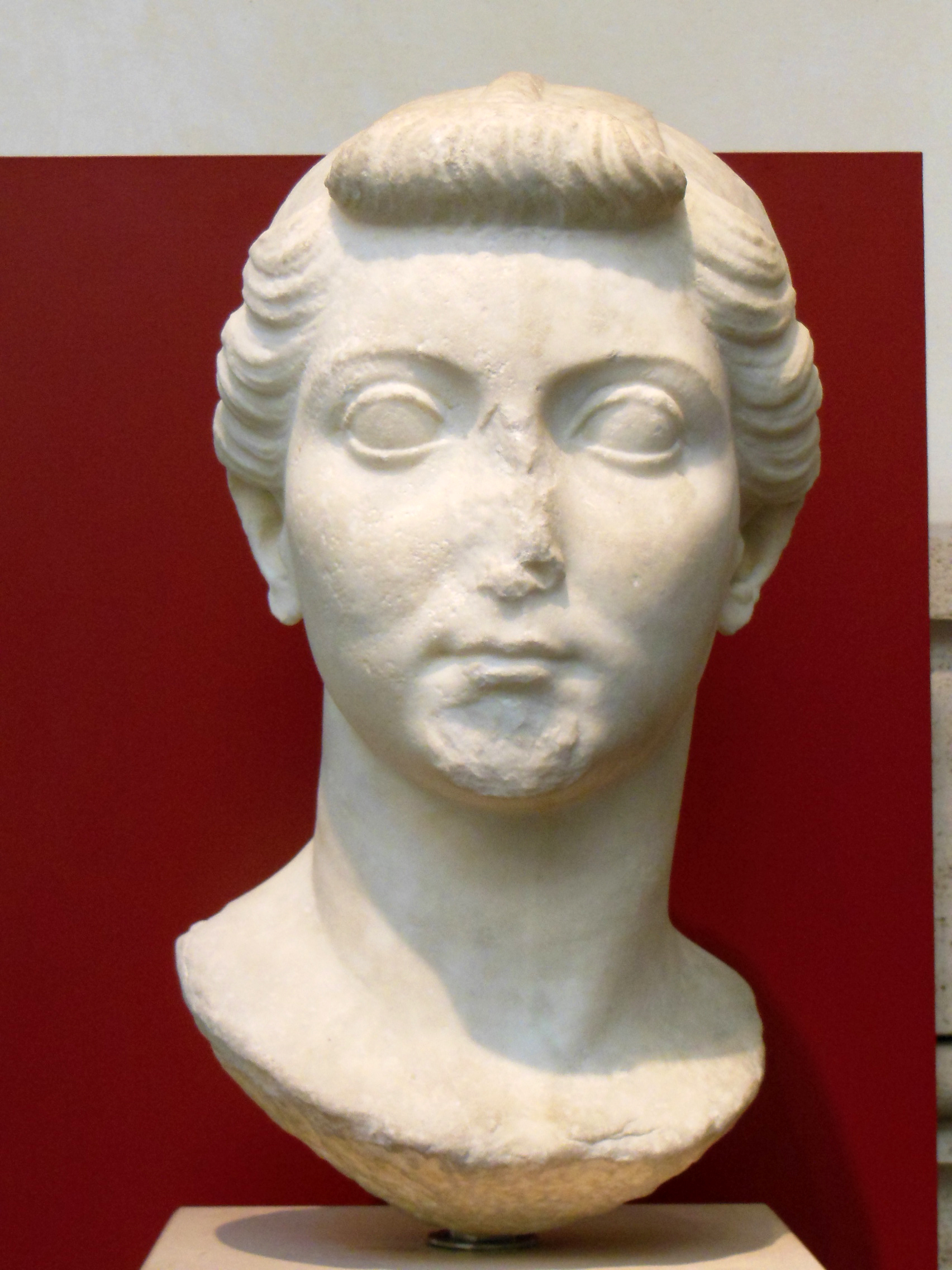
Livia Drusilla (58 B.C. - 29 A.D.), wife of Augustus

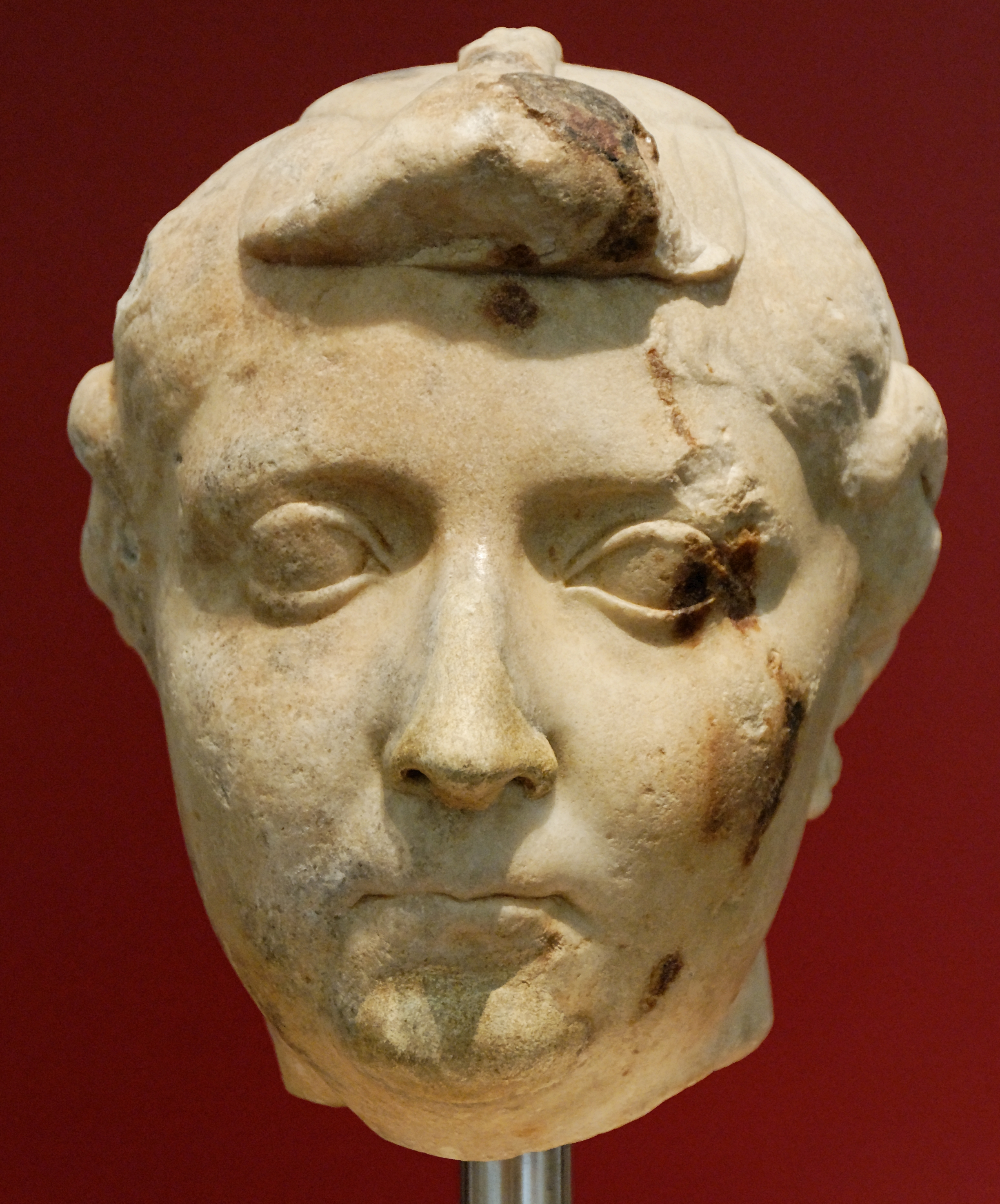
Livia Drusilla (second portrait)

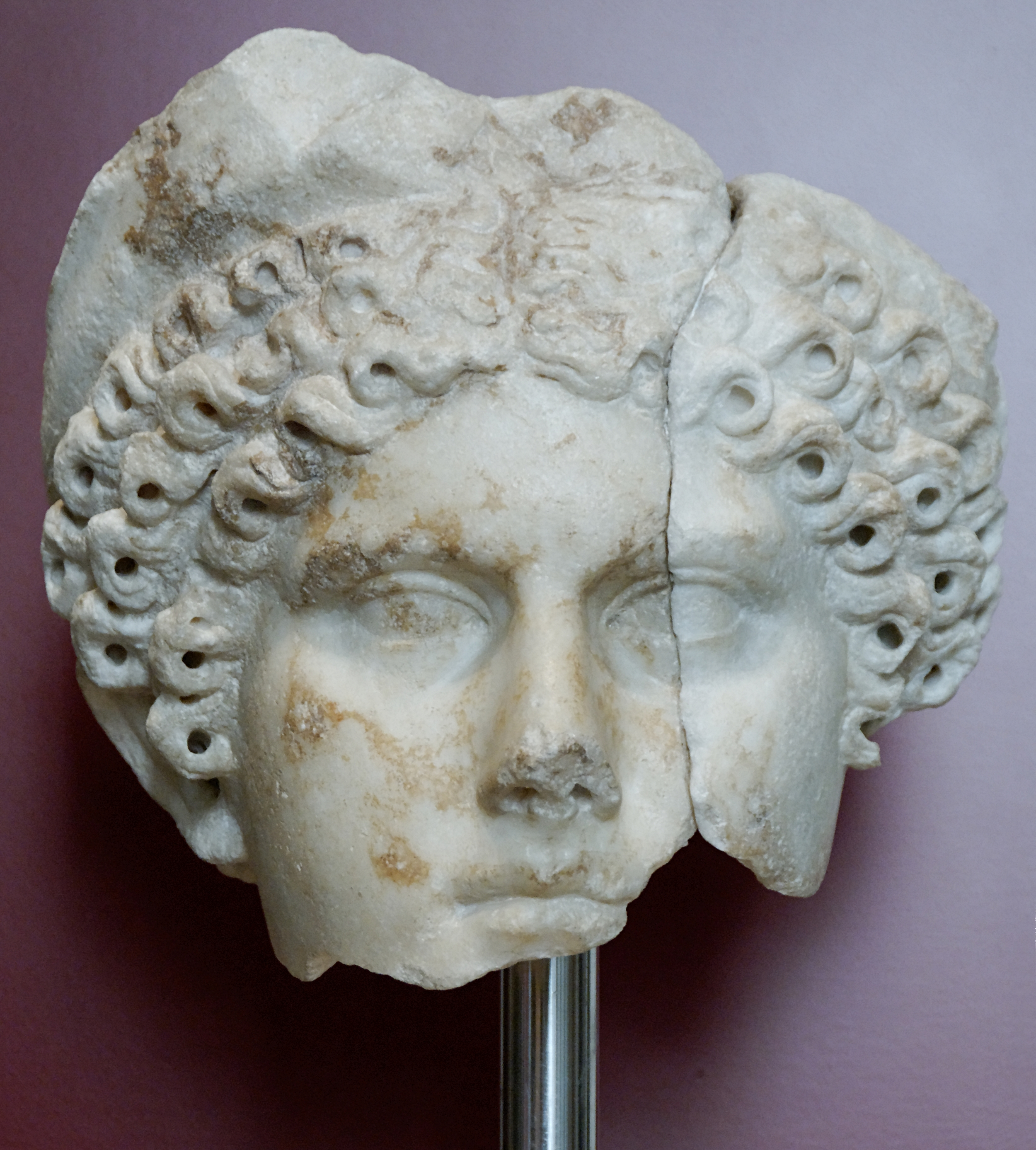
Agrippina the Younger (15 - 59 AD).

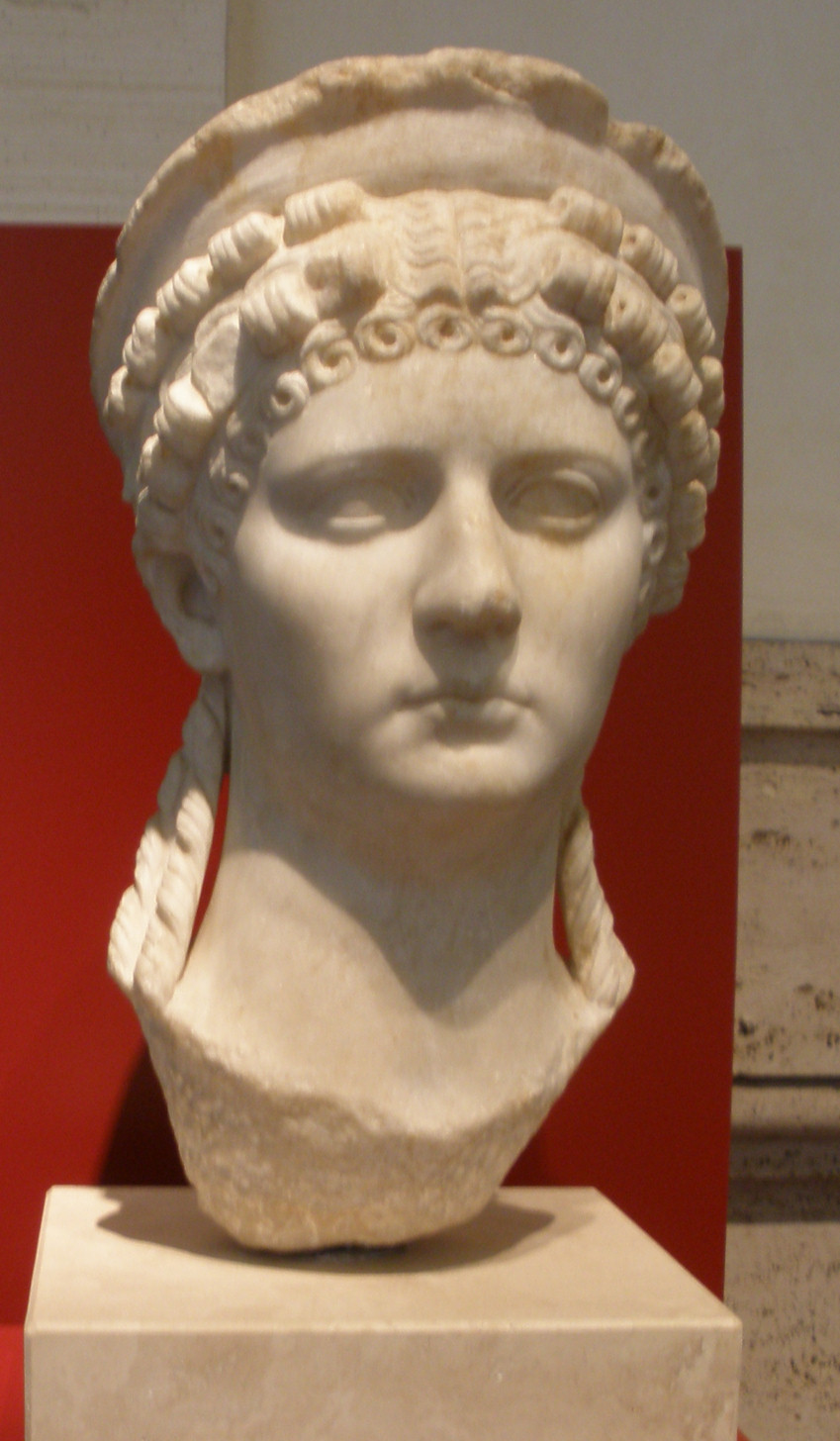
Poppaea Sabina (30 - 65 AD), second wife of Nero

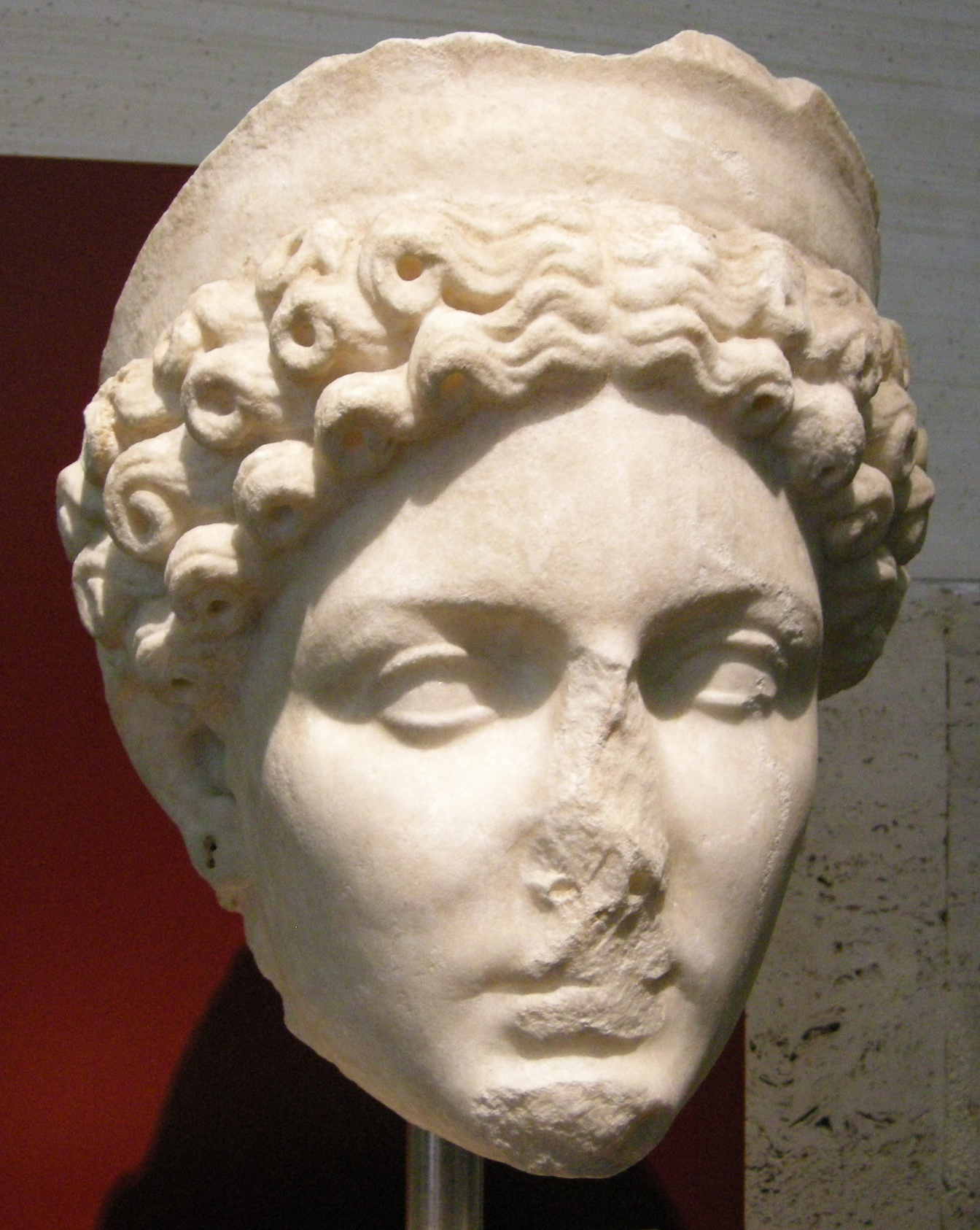
Claudia Octavia (40 - 62 AD).

Also in the room is a statue of a young girl from Ostia, depicted as the goddess Artemis, a symbol of hunting, animals and archery, as well as being the goddess of female initiations.

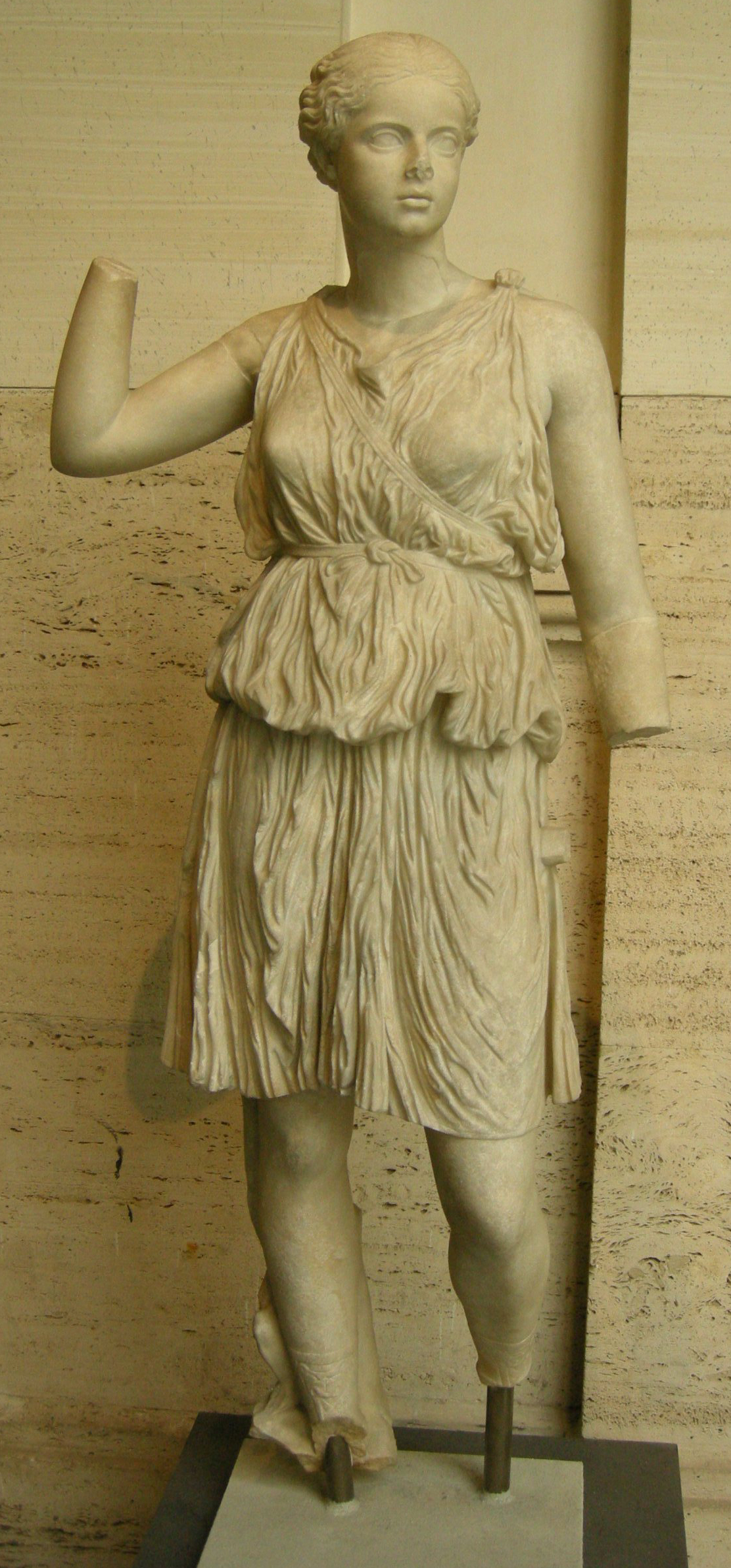
A young girl represented as Artemis (Cisarii baths in Ostia)

=== Room V (ground floor) ===
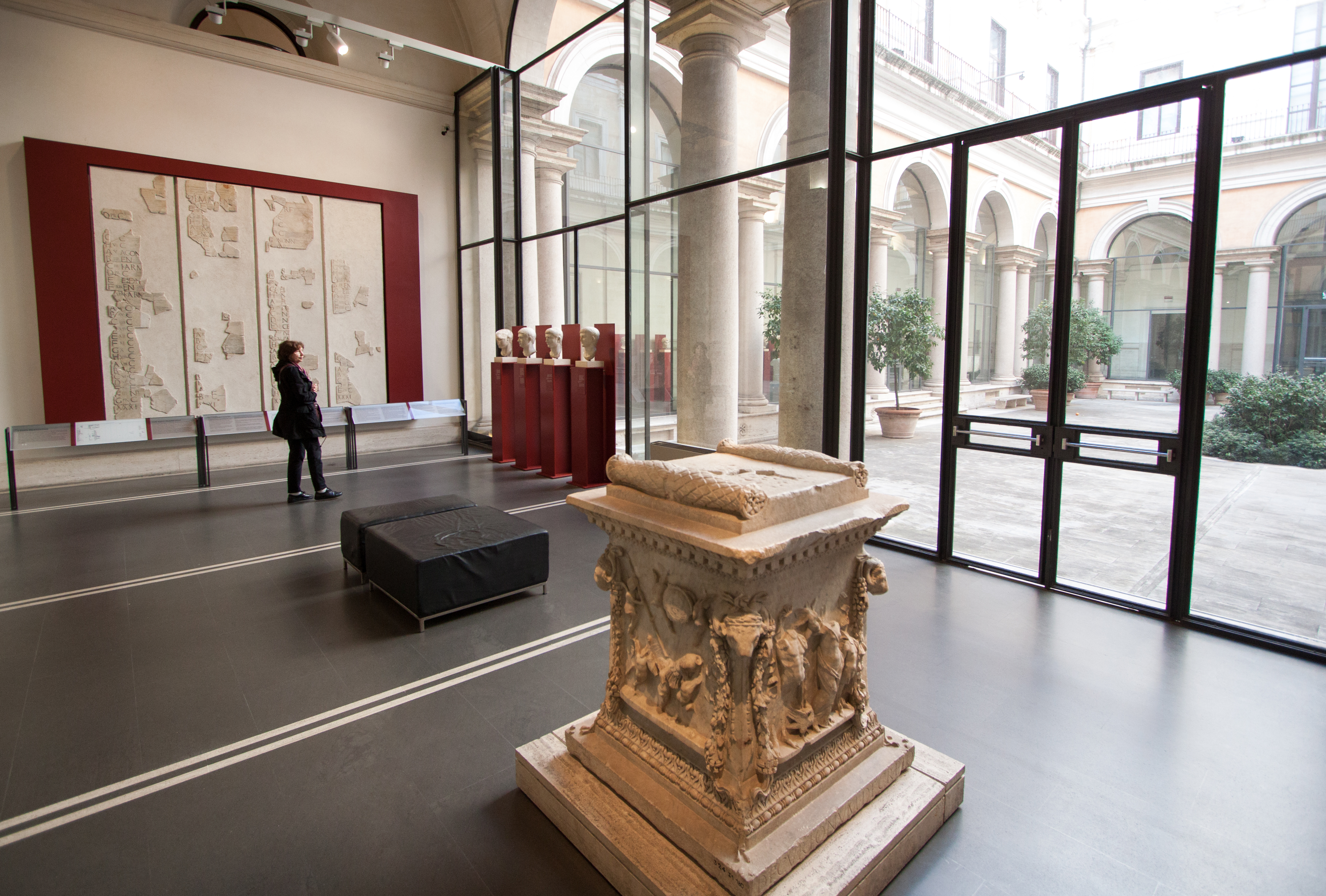
"Room V" with some portraits of the Julio-Claudian dynasty in the background and the altar to Mars and Venus in the foreground

The portraits of the Julio-Claudian dynasty in "room IV" are complemented by others in "room V," as well as the statue known as Augustus of Via Labicana, a portrait of Emperor Augustus as pontifex maximus, found in what was Livia's villa near Via Labicana.

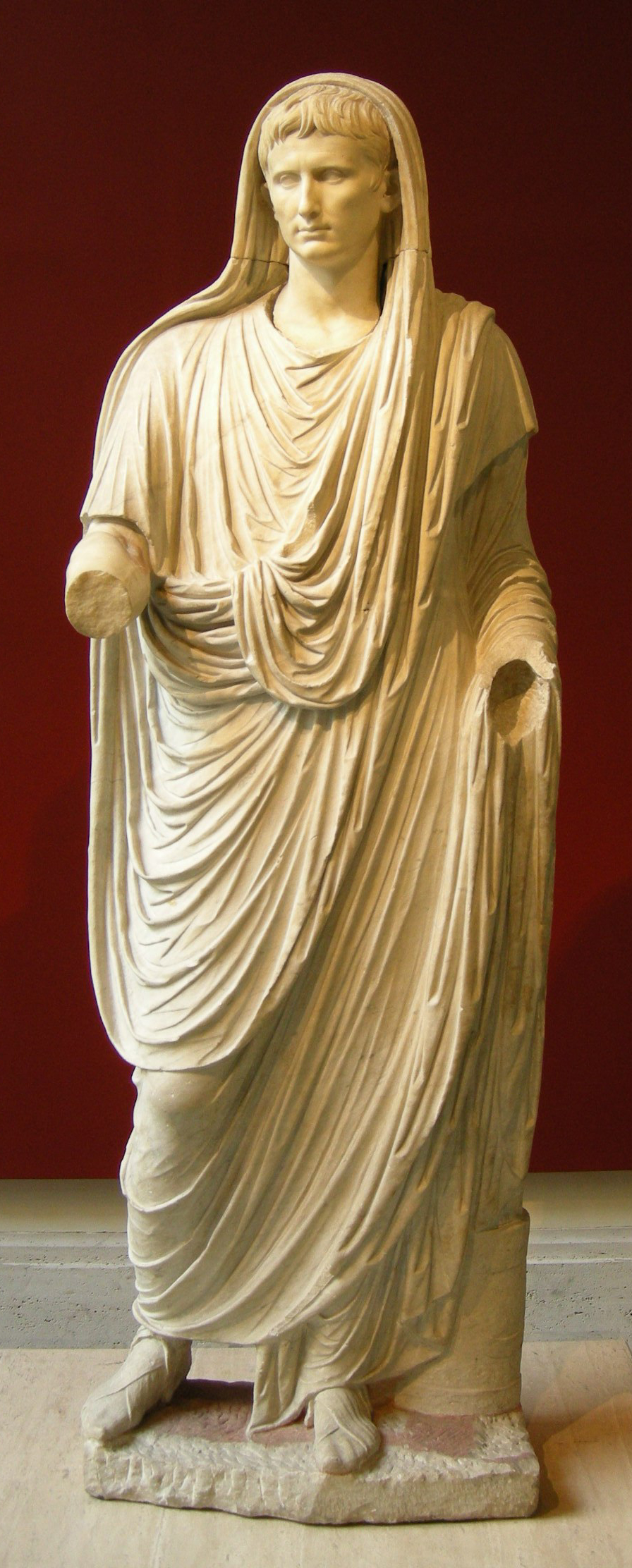
Via Labicana Augustus

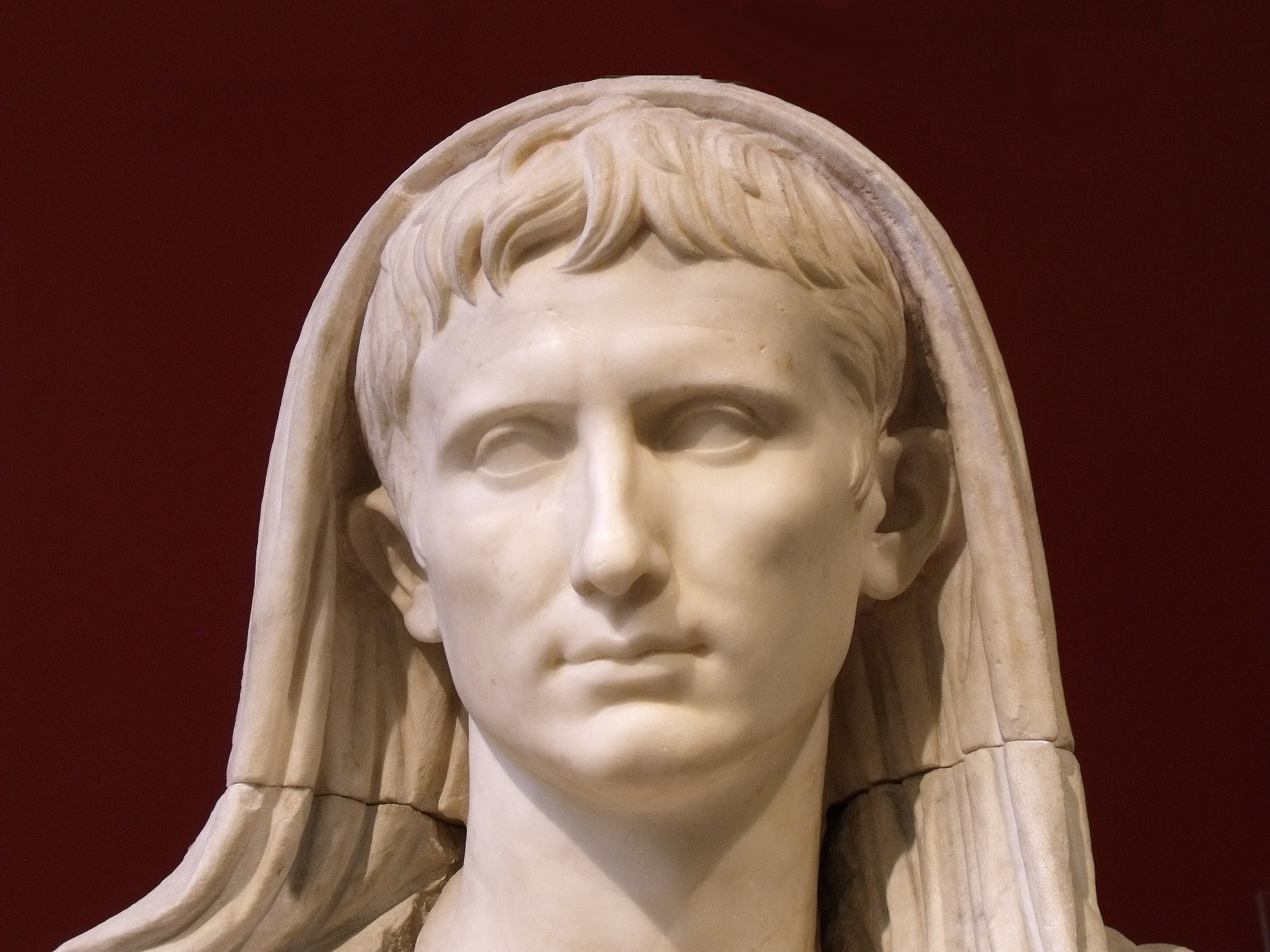
Detail of the face

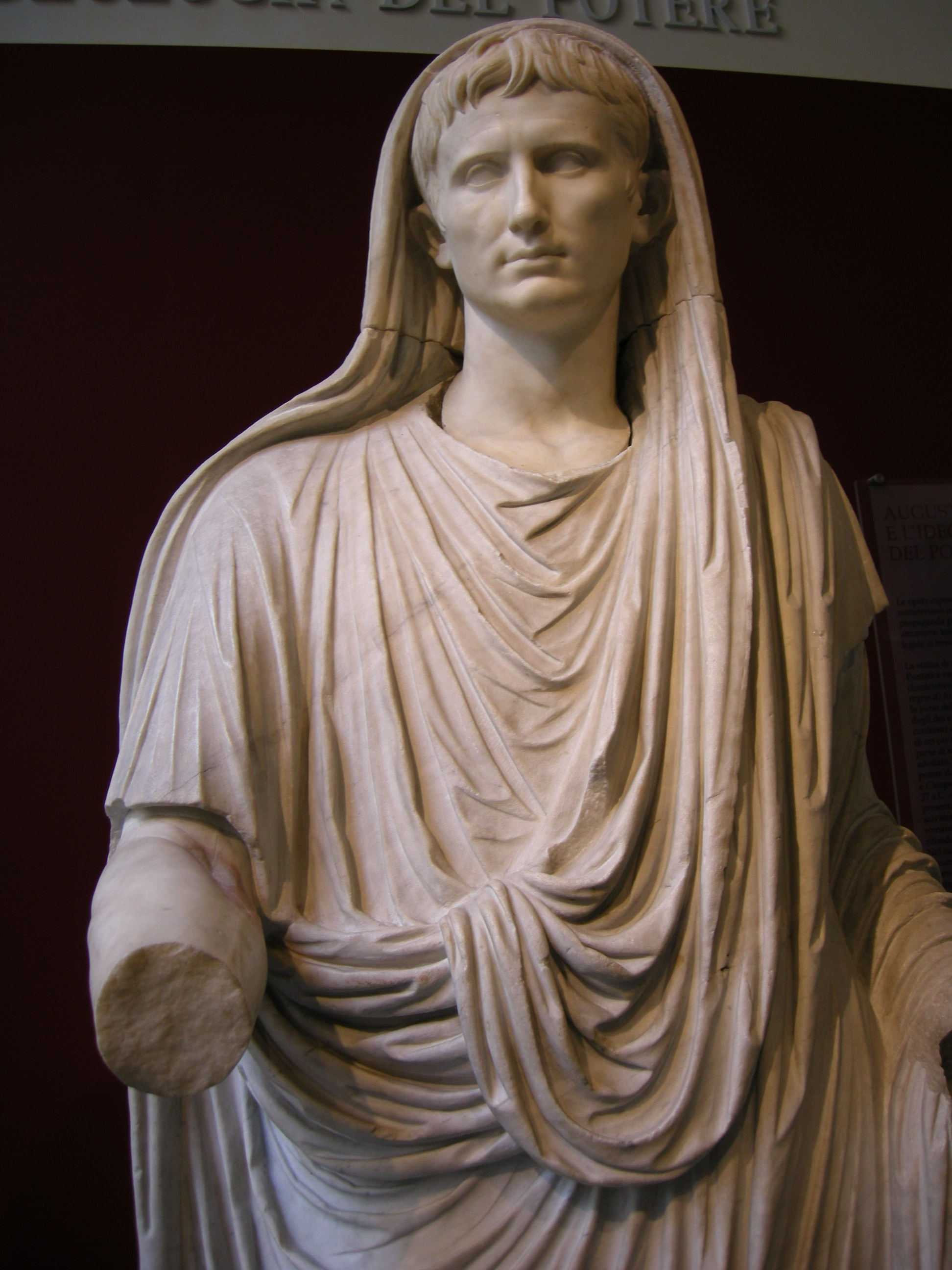
Detail of the half-bust

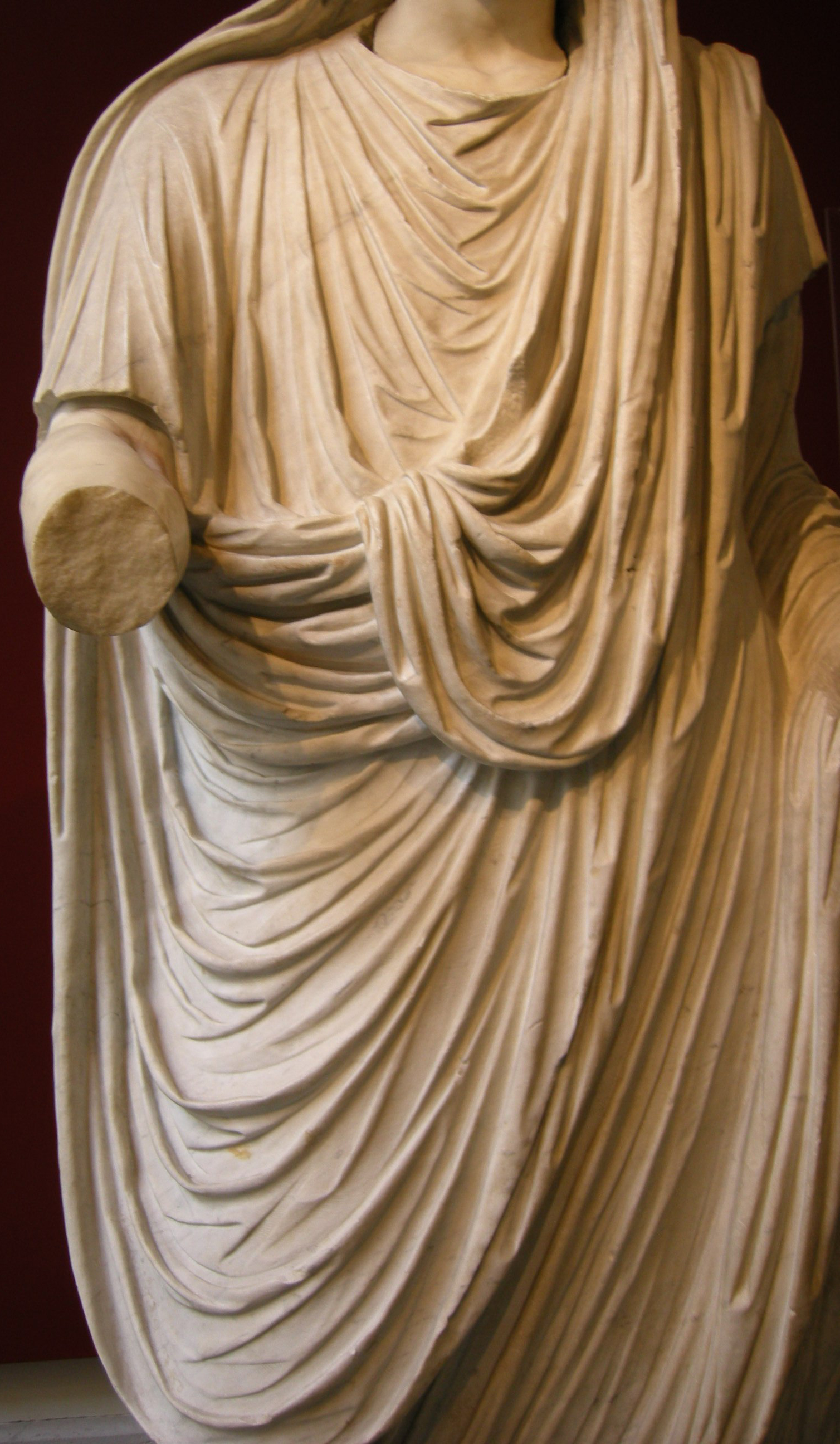
Detail of the toga

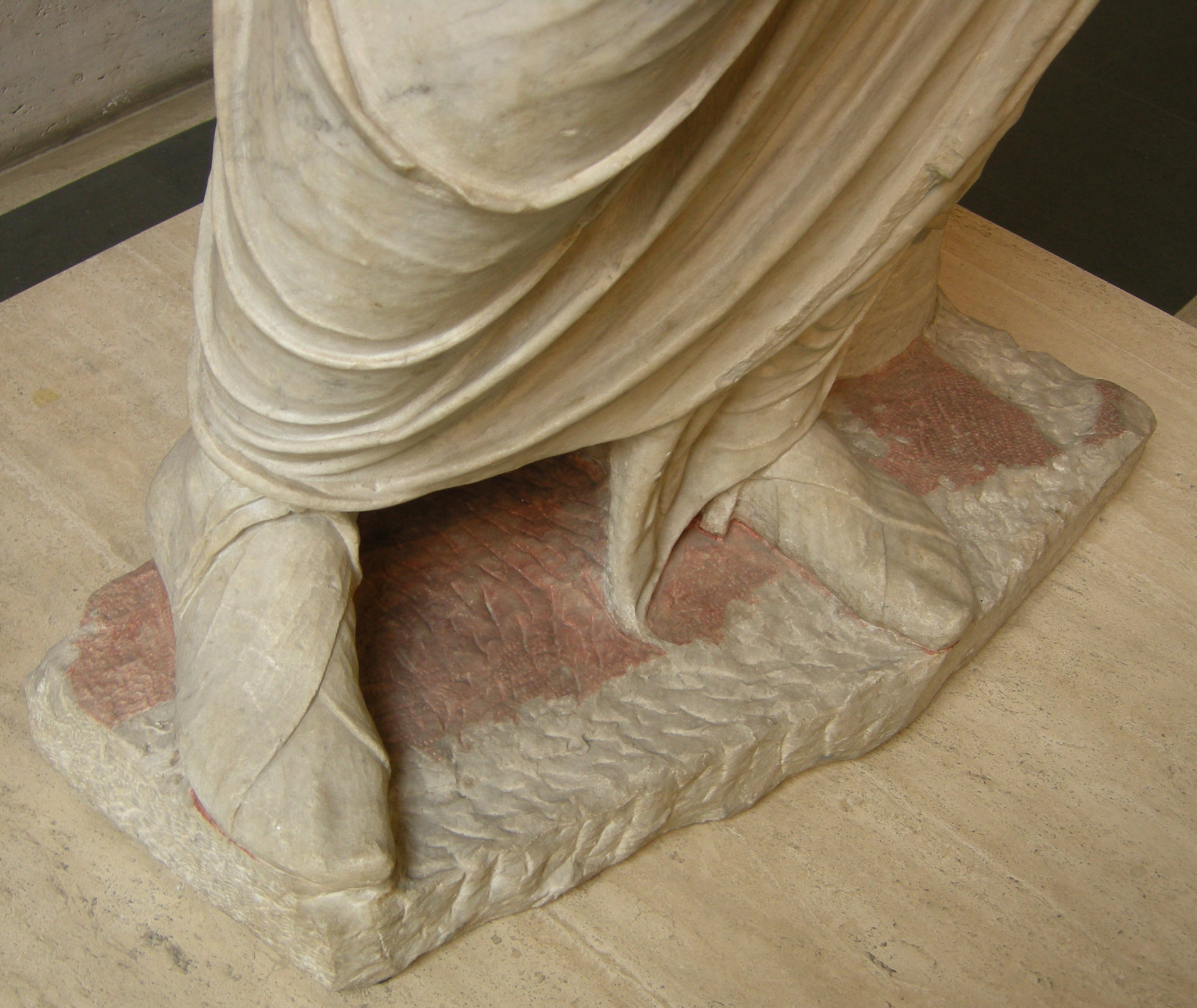
Detail of the base

There is also a marble altar dedicated to Mars and Venus from ancient Ostia. This altar is dated to the first half of the second century CE and commemorated the ancestor gods of the Roman people: the former as the father of Romulus, the latter as the mother of Aeneas, as reflected in the image of Romulus and Remus suckled by the she-wolf, carved on one of the facades of the altar.

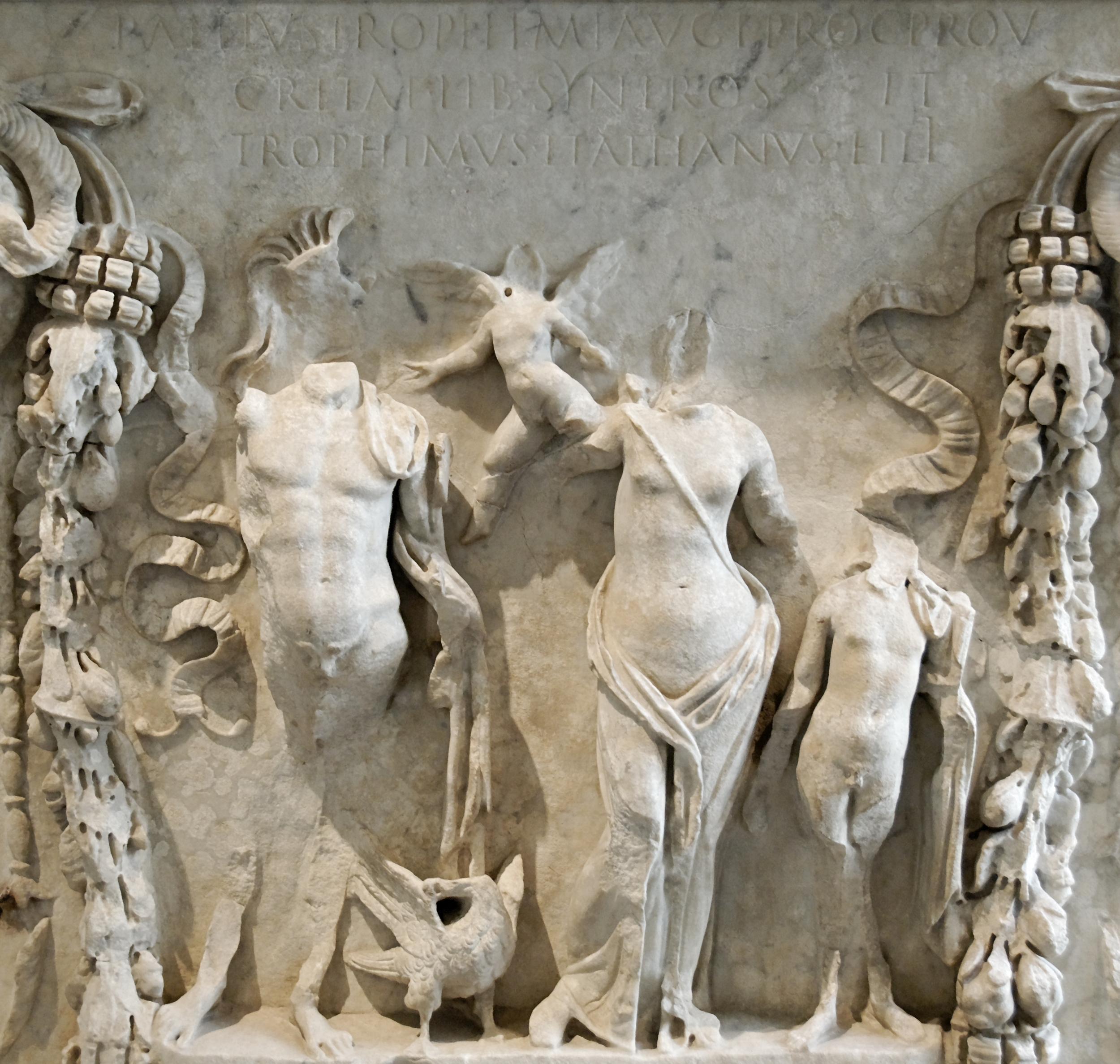
Altar to Mars and Venus

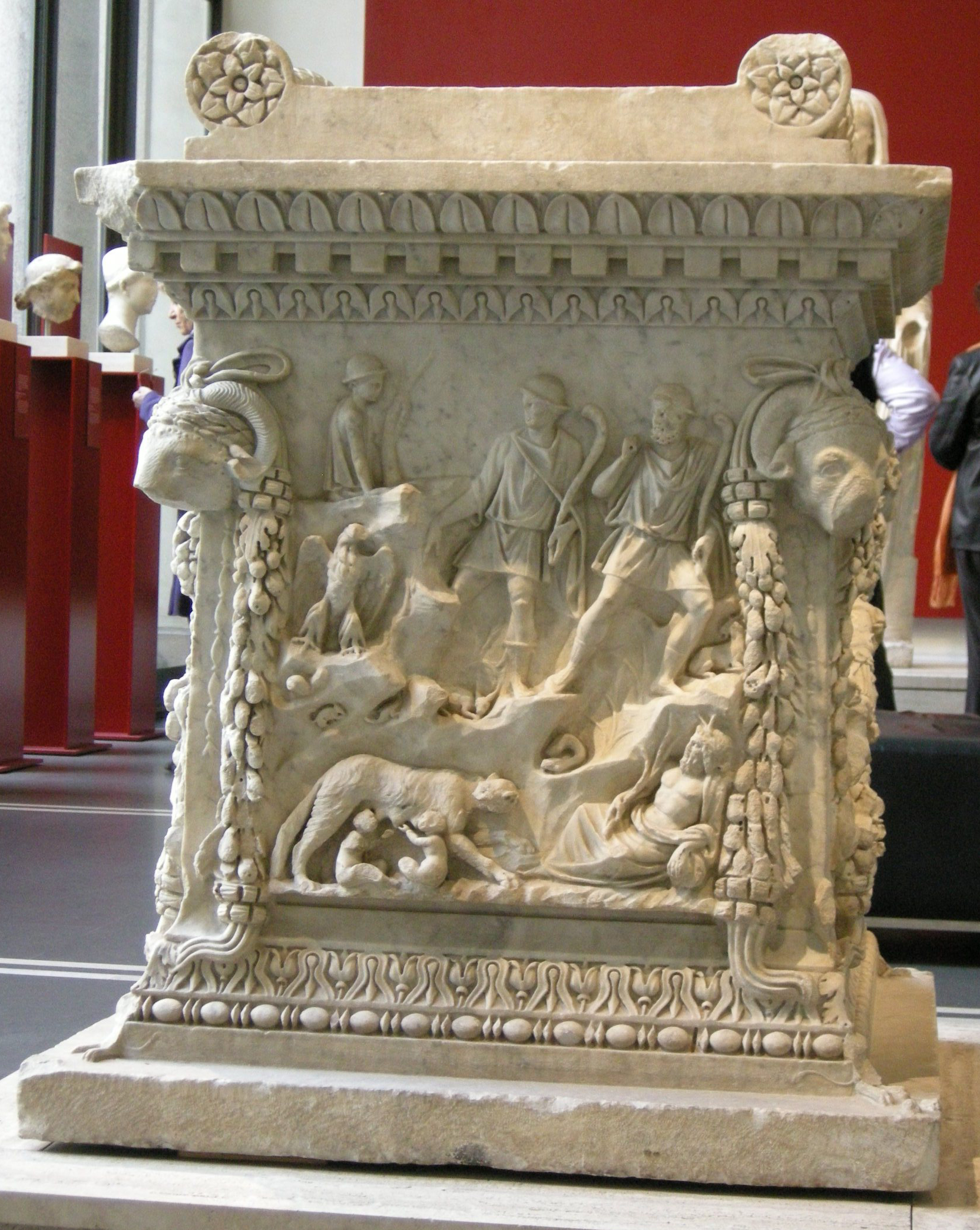
Side with the depiction of the founding of Rome, the she-wolf, Romulus and Remus

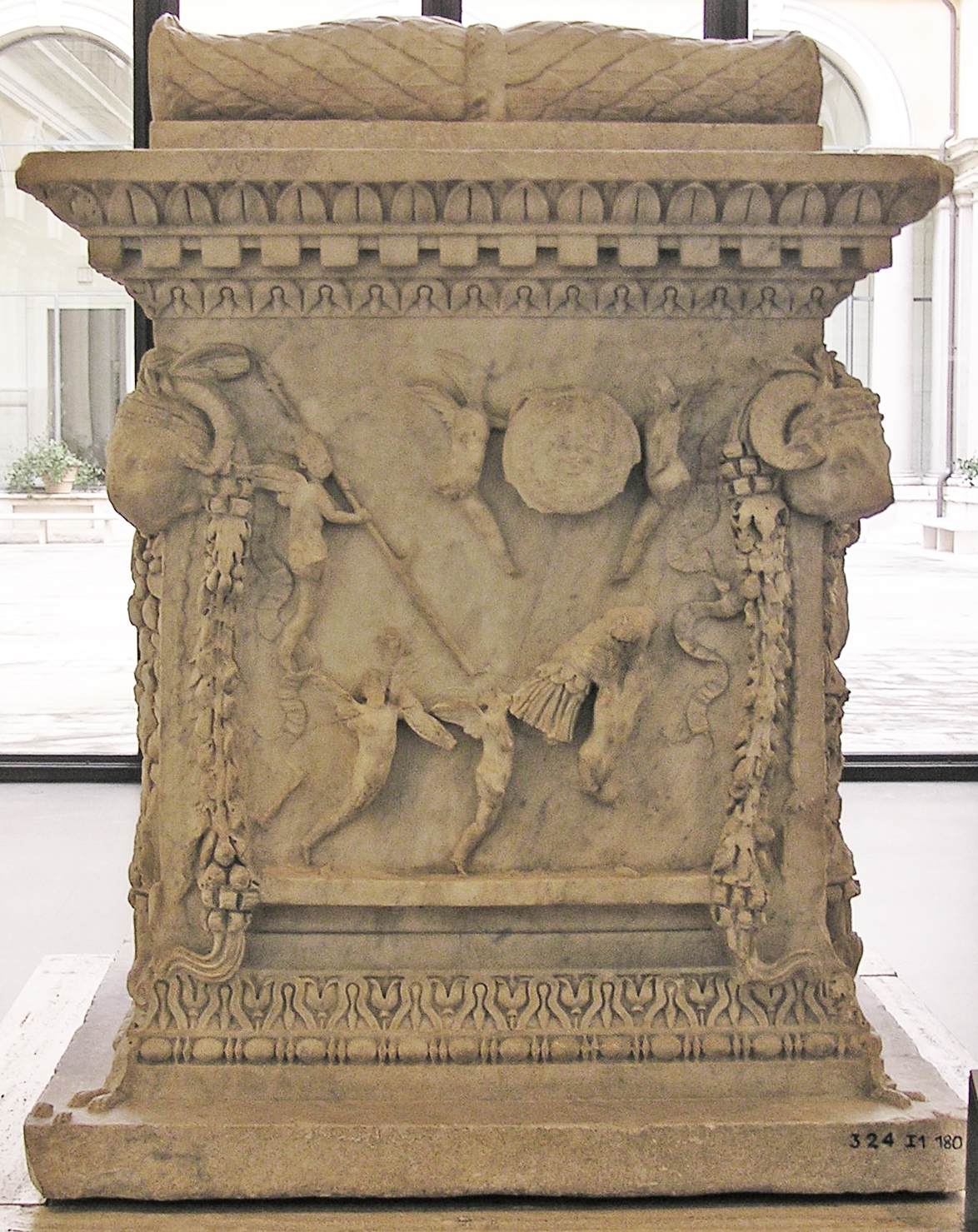
Side with Amorini playing with the weapons of Mars

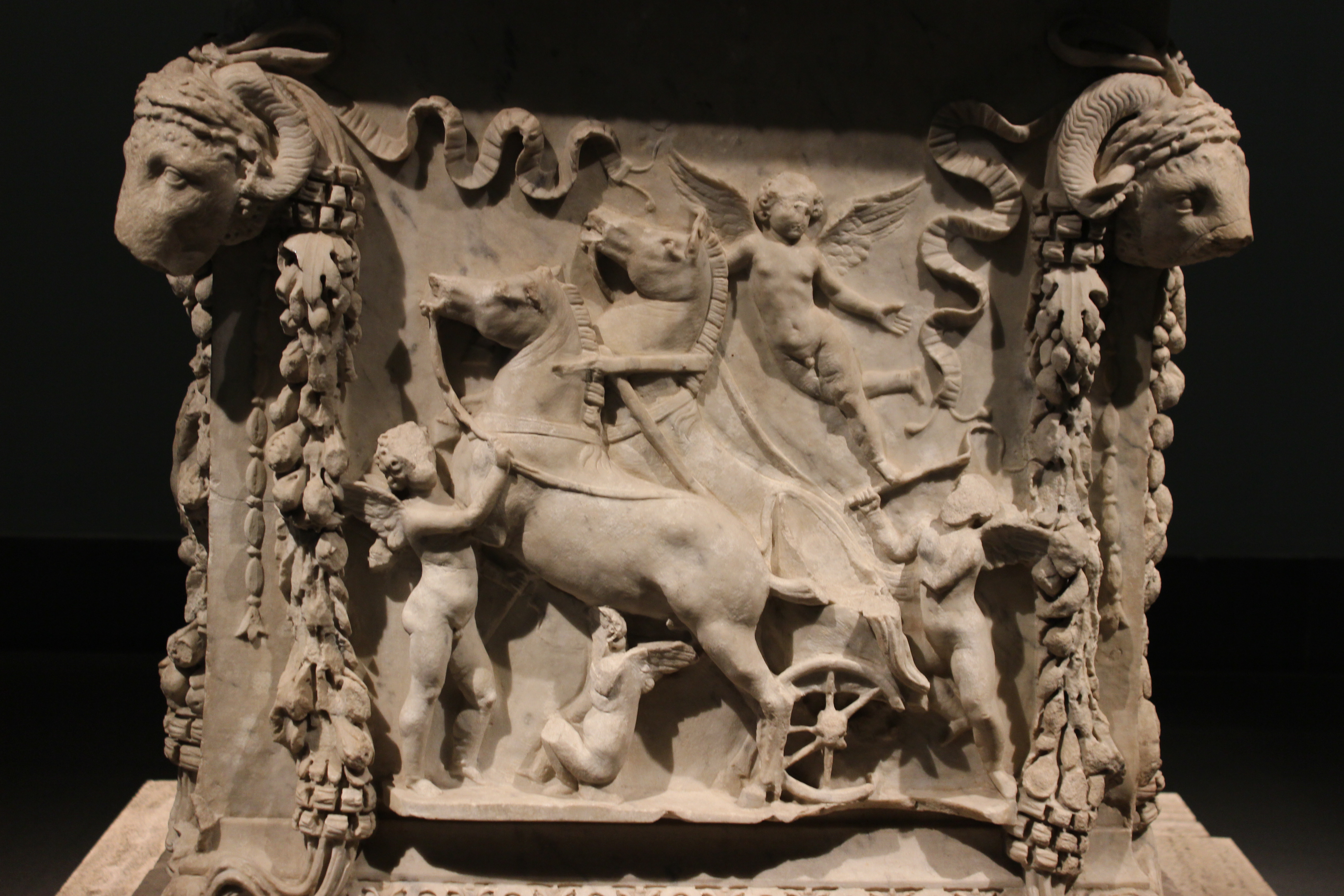
Side with playful cherubs playing with the chariot of Venus

Also in "room V" is part of the historical frieze of the Basilica Aemilia in the Roman Forum. It was found in numerous fragments during various excavations. It is 0.76 meters high. The frieze is an early example of the reception of Hellenistic models in the Roman sphere, predating the spread of Neo-Atticism, which flattened Roman art toward a colder and more academic reproduction of classical Greek art models. The dating of the work is highly controversial, oscillating between the Sullan-Caesarian and Augustan ages. However, opinions regarding the later periods are discardable on the basis of stylistic elements, making a time span between the early and late first century B.C. likely.

The frieze originally measured more than one hundred meters, where an account of the entire Roman history starting from the primordia was depicted.

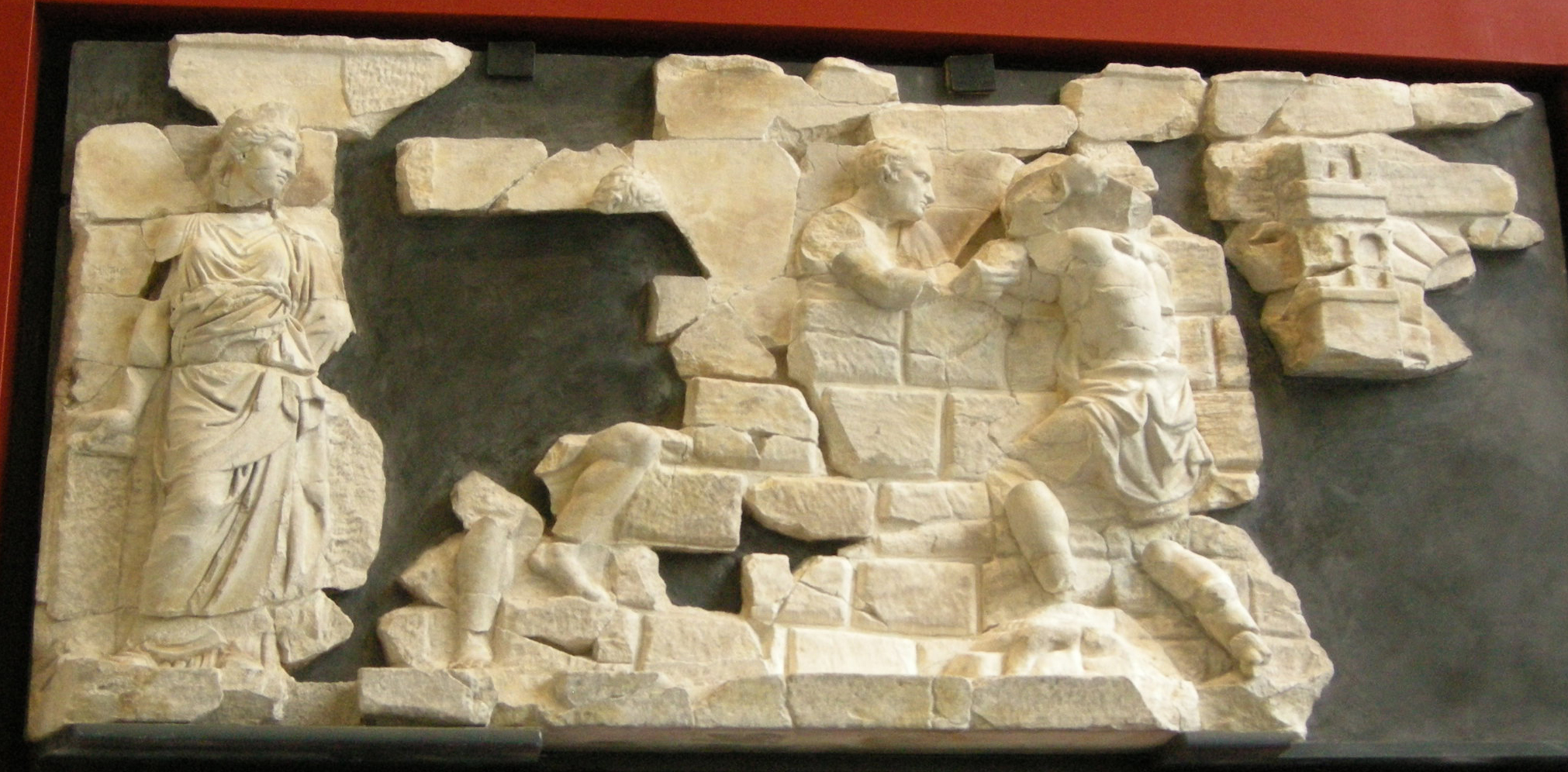
Historical frieze of the Basilica Emilia: foundation of a city (Rome?), represented by the construction of walls and a gate, flanked by its female personification

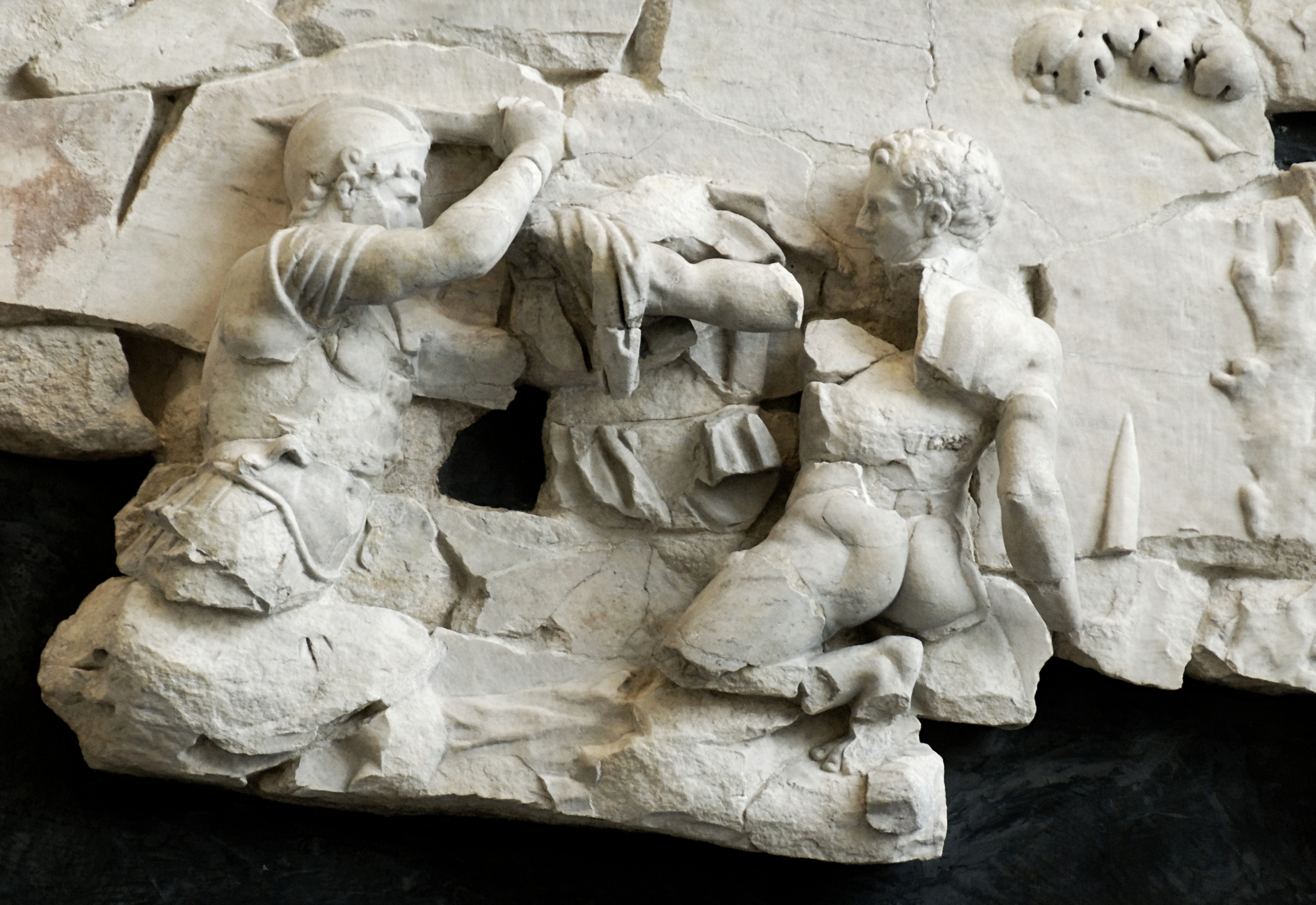
Frieze of the Basilica Aemilia: scene of a battle against the Sabines or Gauls.

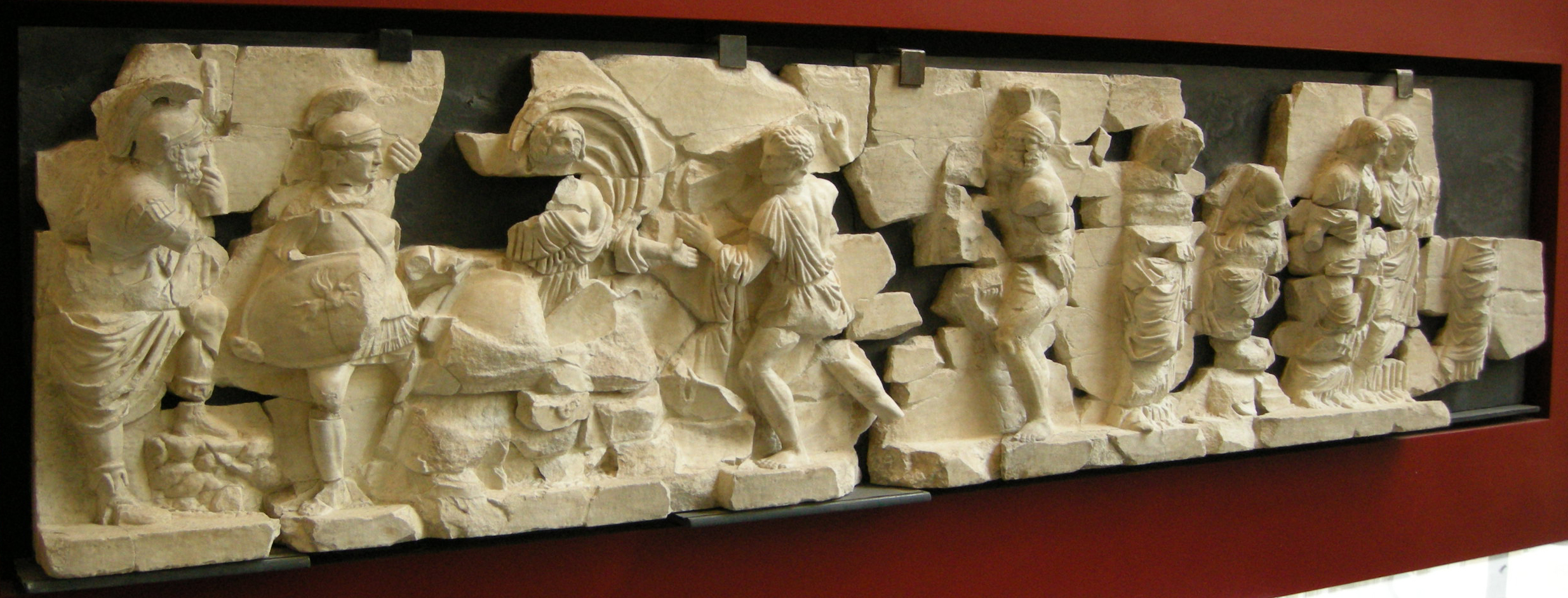
Frieze of the Basilica Aemilia: the punishment of Tarpeia, buried under a pile of weapons before the Sabine king Titus Tatius

Finally, there is a painted frieze, coming from the Esquiline and found in 1875 in the area of the Porta Maggiore square, which depicted a small columbarium of the powerful family of Titus Statilius Taurus. The scenes depicted are 38 cm high and are bordered by a dark red band and divided into several episodes, starting with Aeneas, the meeting between Mars and Rhea Silvia, and the birth of the twins, Romulus and Remus.

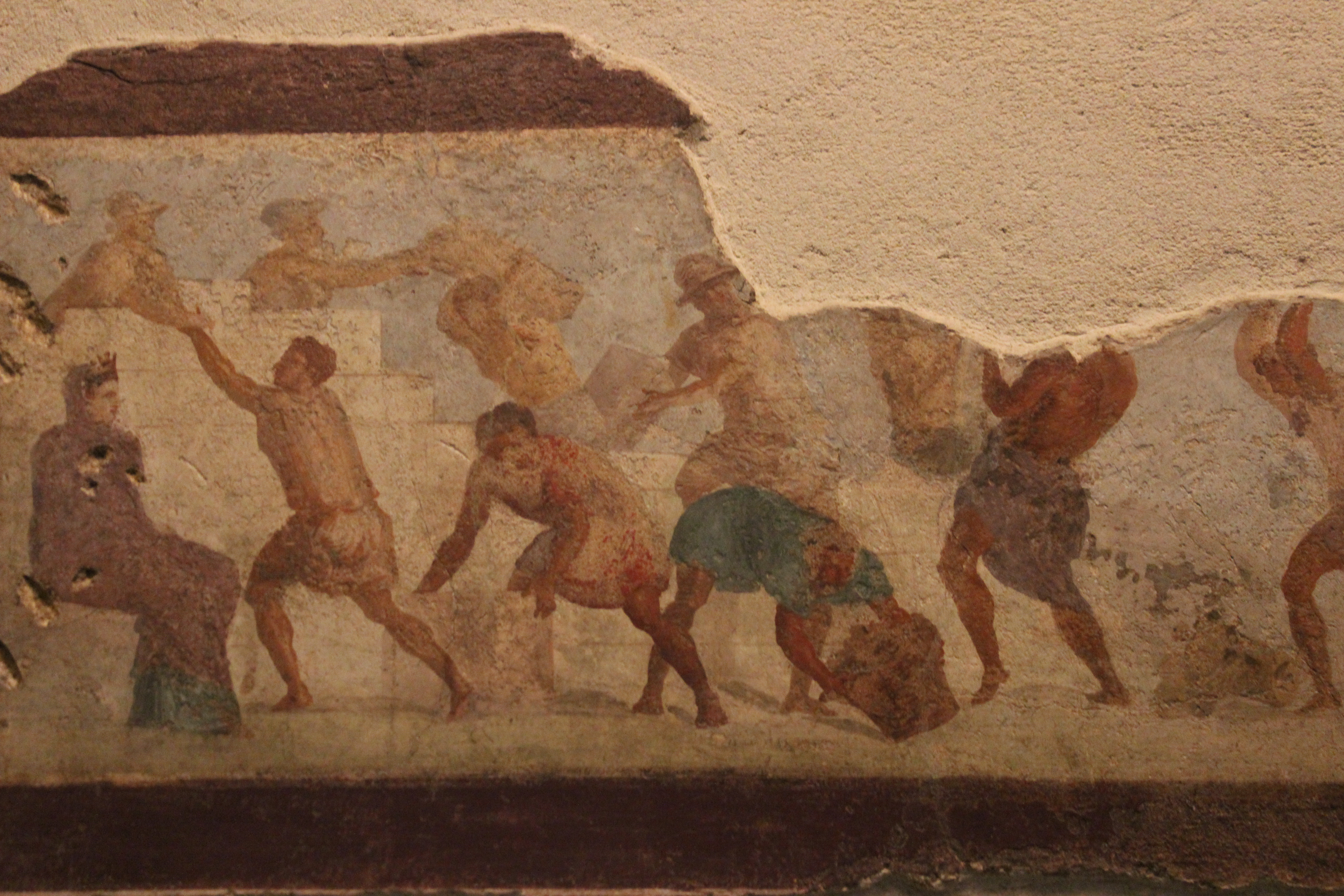
Fresco from the Esquiline columbarium with the scene of the founding of Alba Longa

=== Gallery III (ground floor) ===
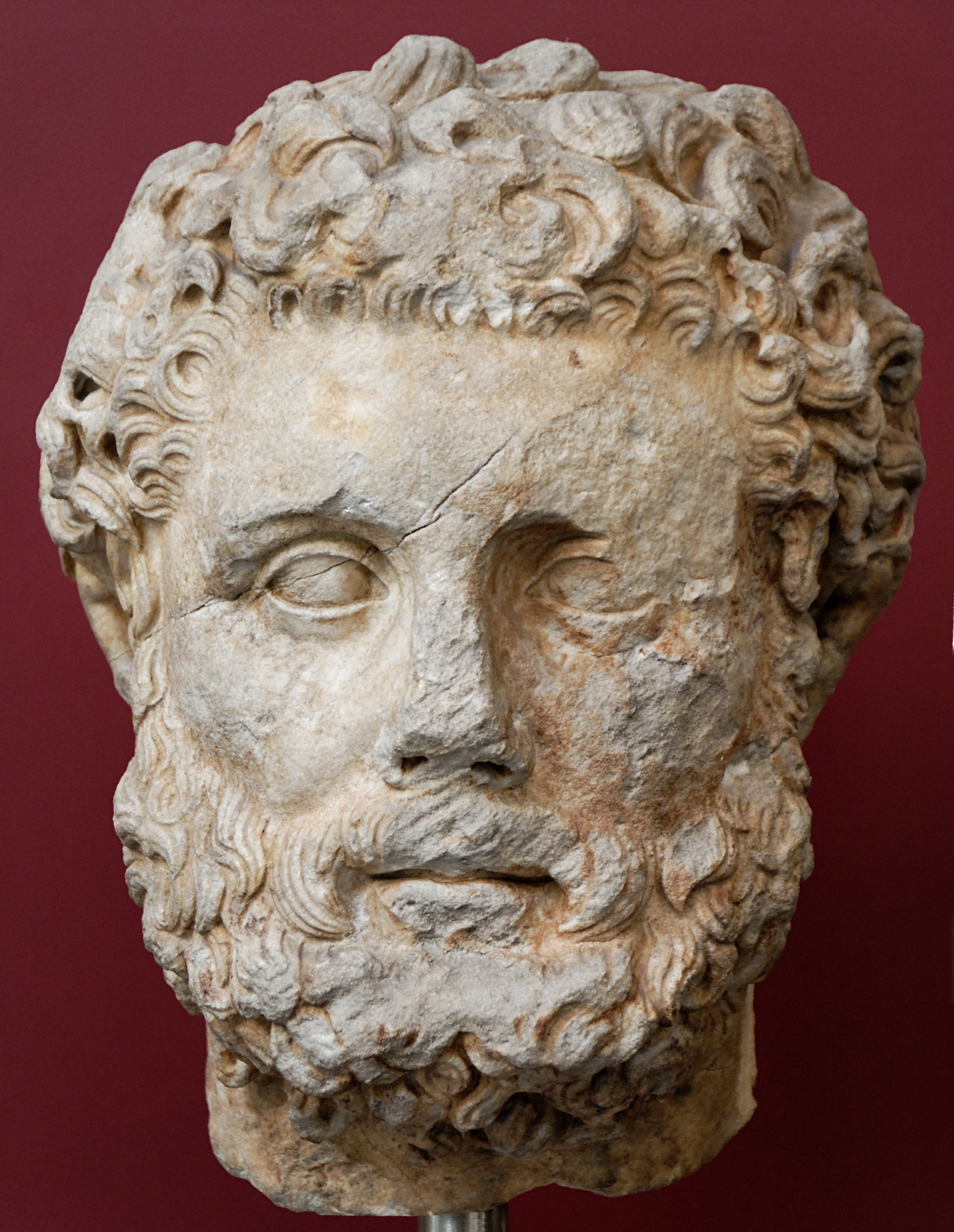
Bust of a boxer (Greek marble, 2nd-century A.D. Roman copy from a 4th-century B.C. bronze original), from the ruins of a Roman villa near the convent of St. Pius on the Via Empolitana in Genazzano.

From here on, "Gallery III" begins a series of copies of Greek portraits. One finds busts of philosophers such as Socrates, of poets such as Hesiod, of rulers such as Philip V of Macedon, as well as athletes such as the Boxer from the villa at Genazzano. There is also a fine gilded bronze portrait of Alexander the Great, recognizable by the characteristic arrangement of the hair on his forehead. The work belongs to the imperial era, which was also extremely popular in the Roman world.

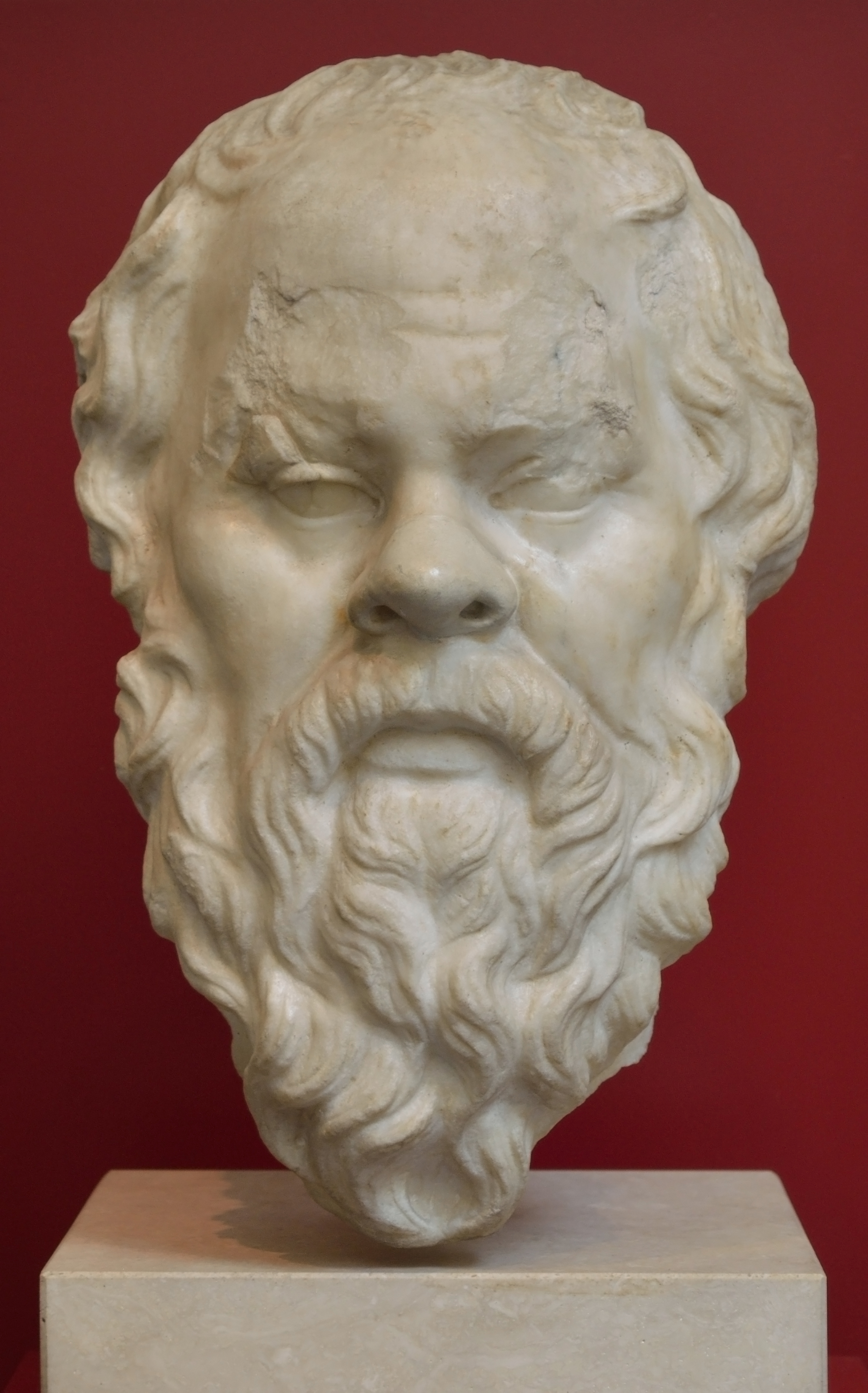
The philosopher Socrates (found in Piazza Venezia; inv. 1.236)

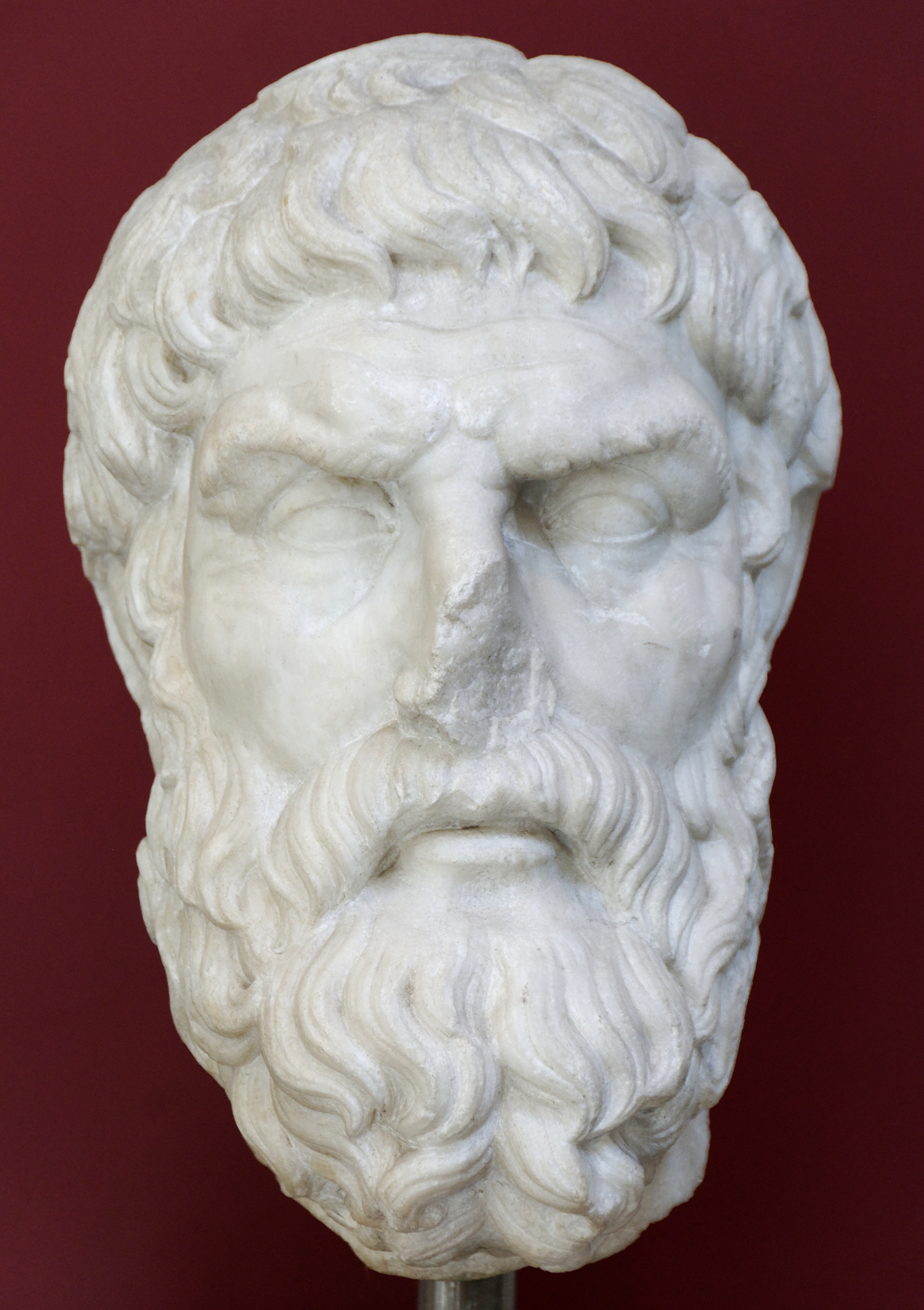
The philosopher Epicurus

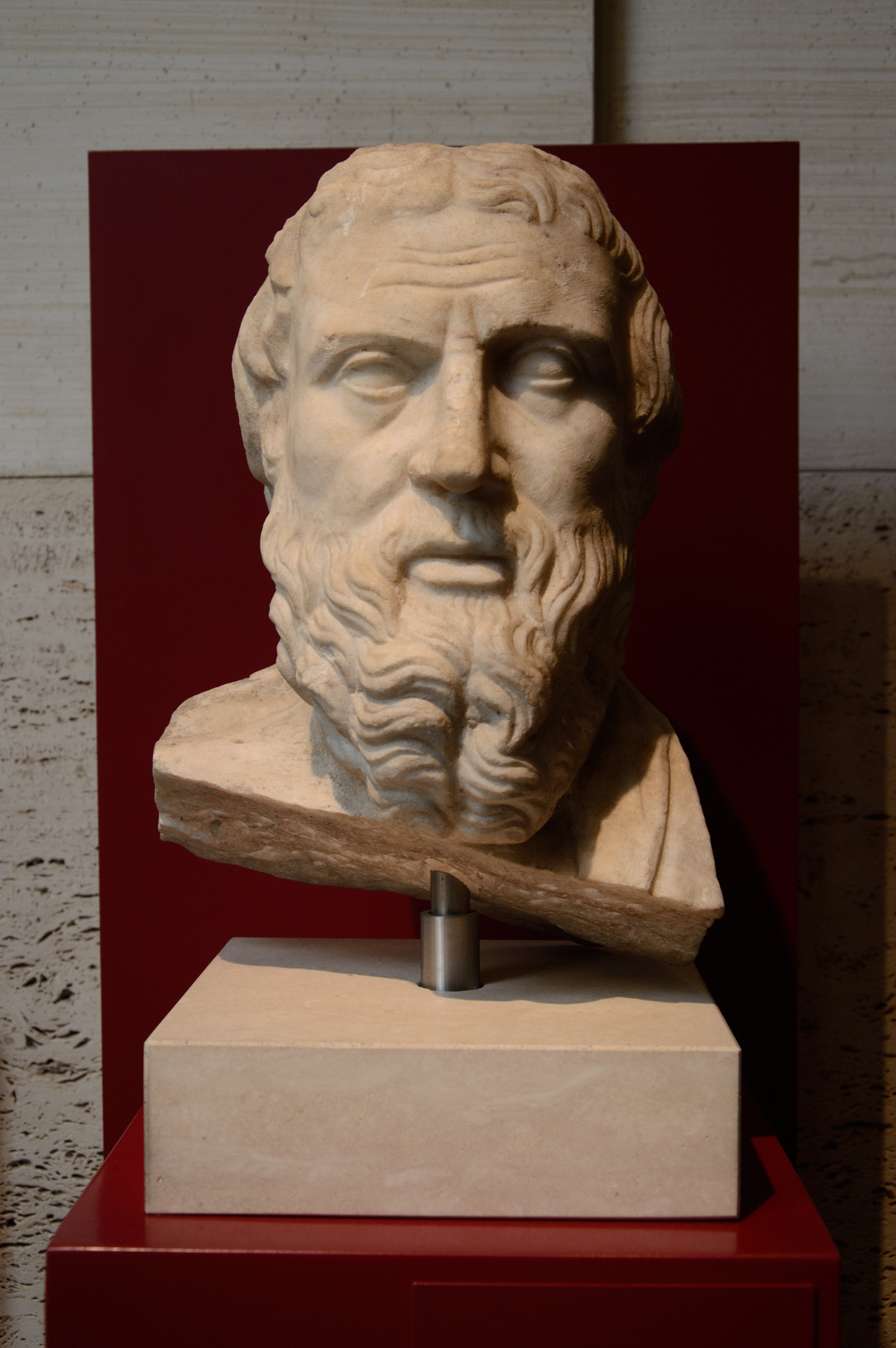
Bust of the Greek historian, Herodotus

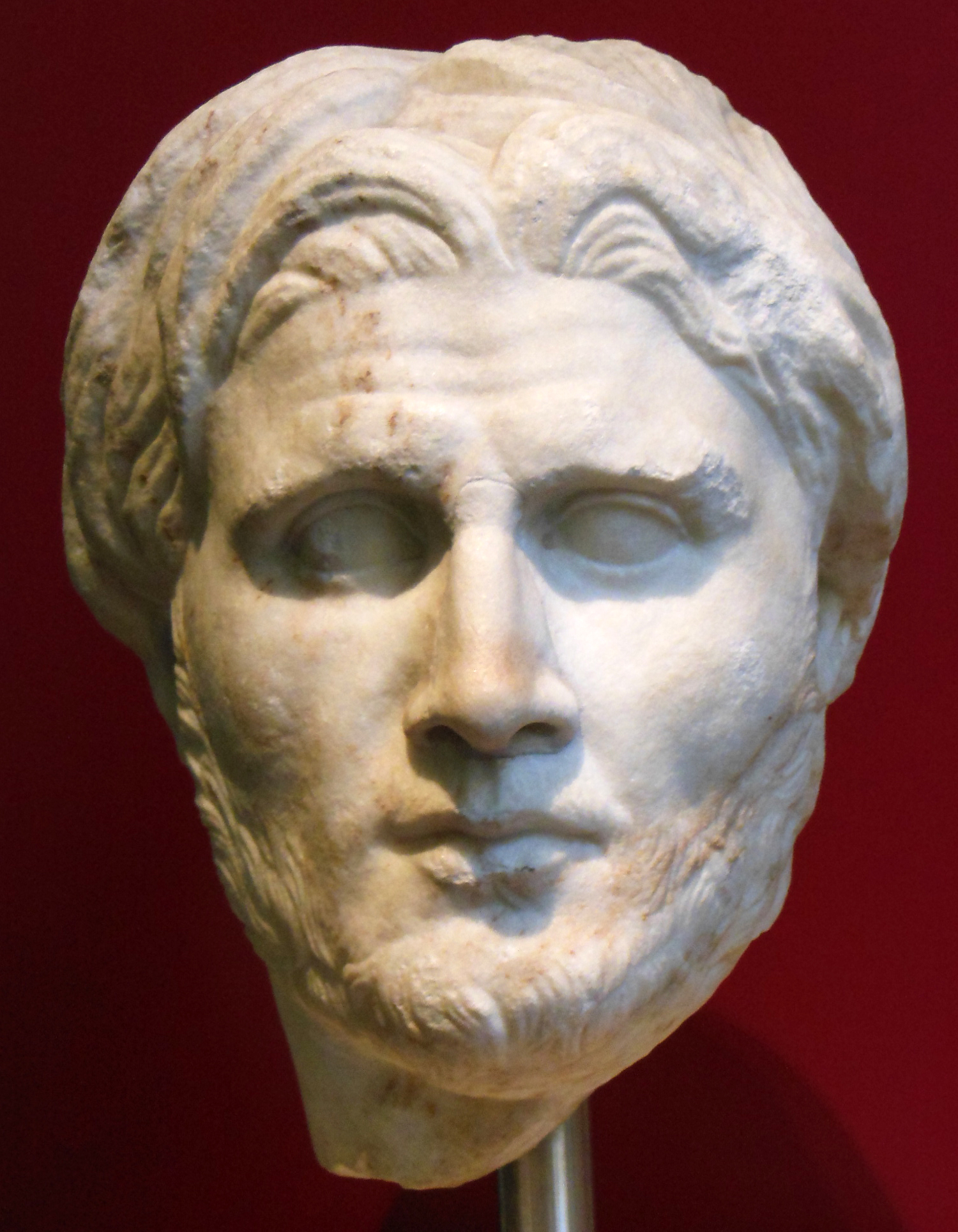
Portrait of the poet Diphilus

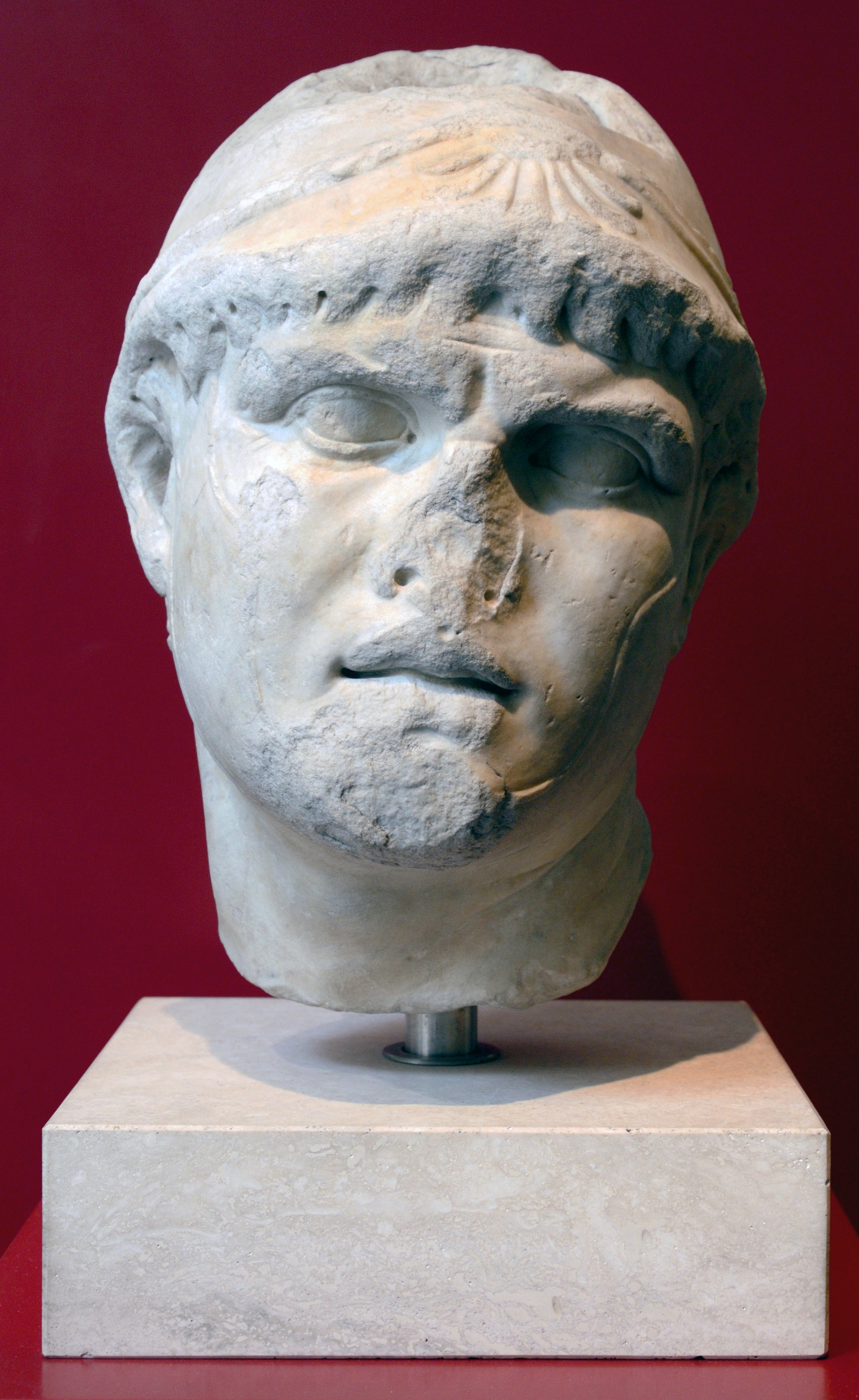
Bust of Philip V of Macedon

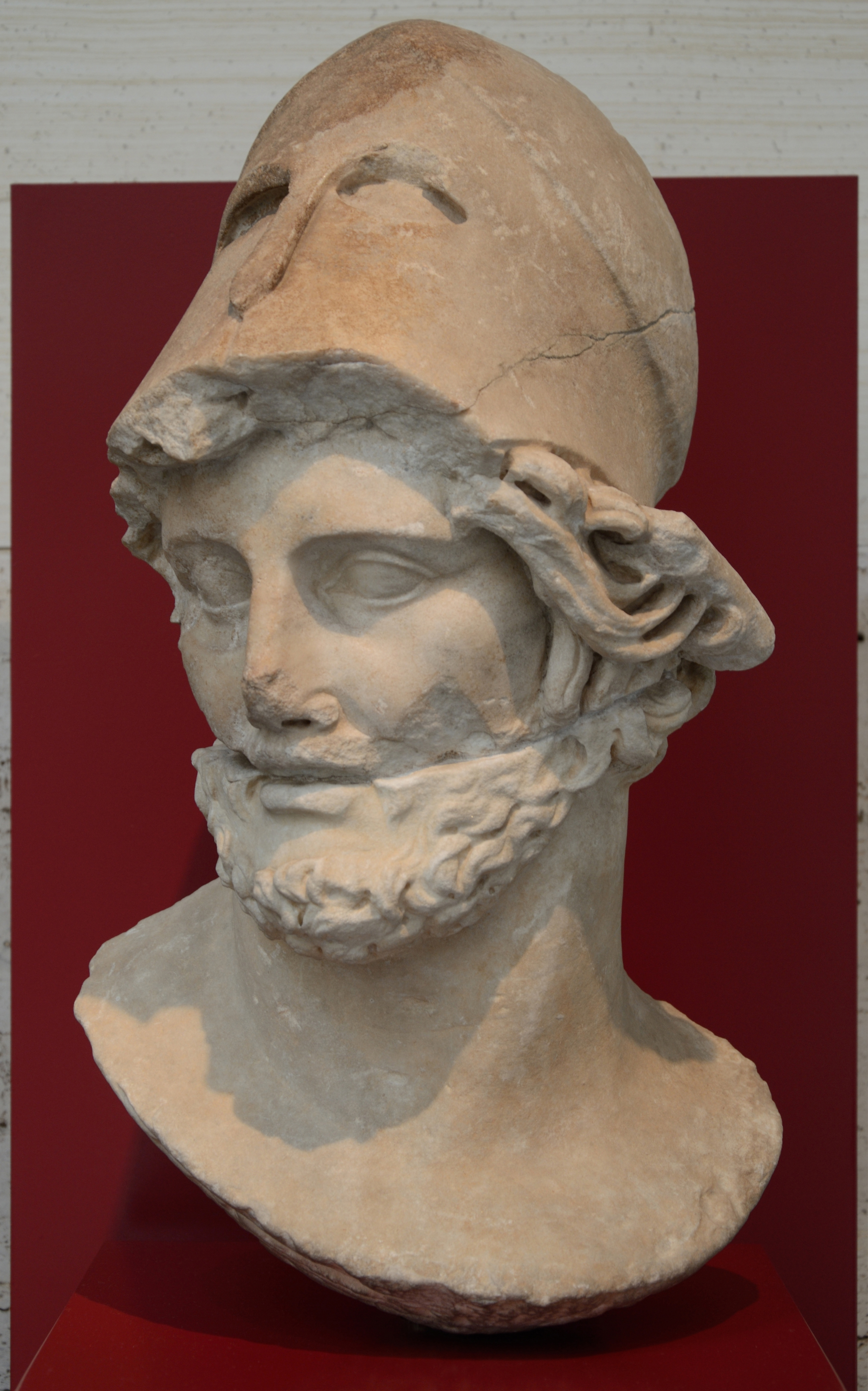
Bust of a Greek strategist

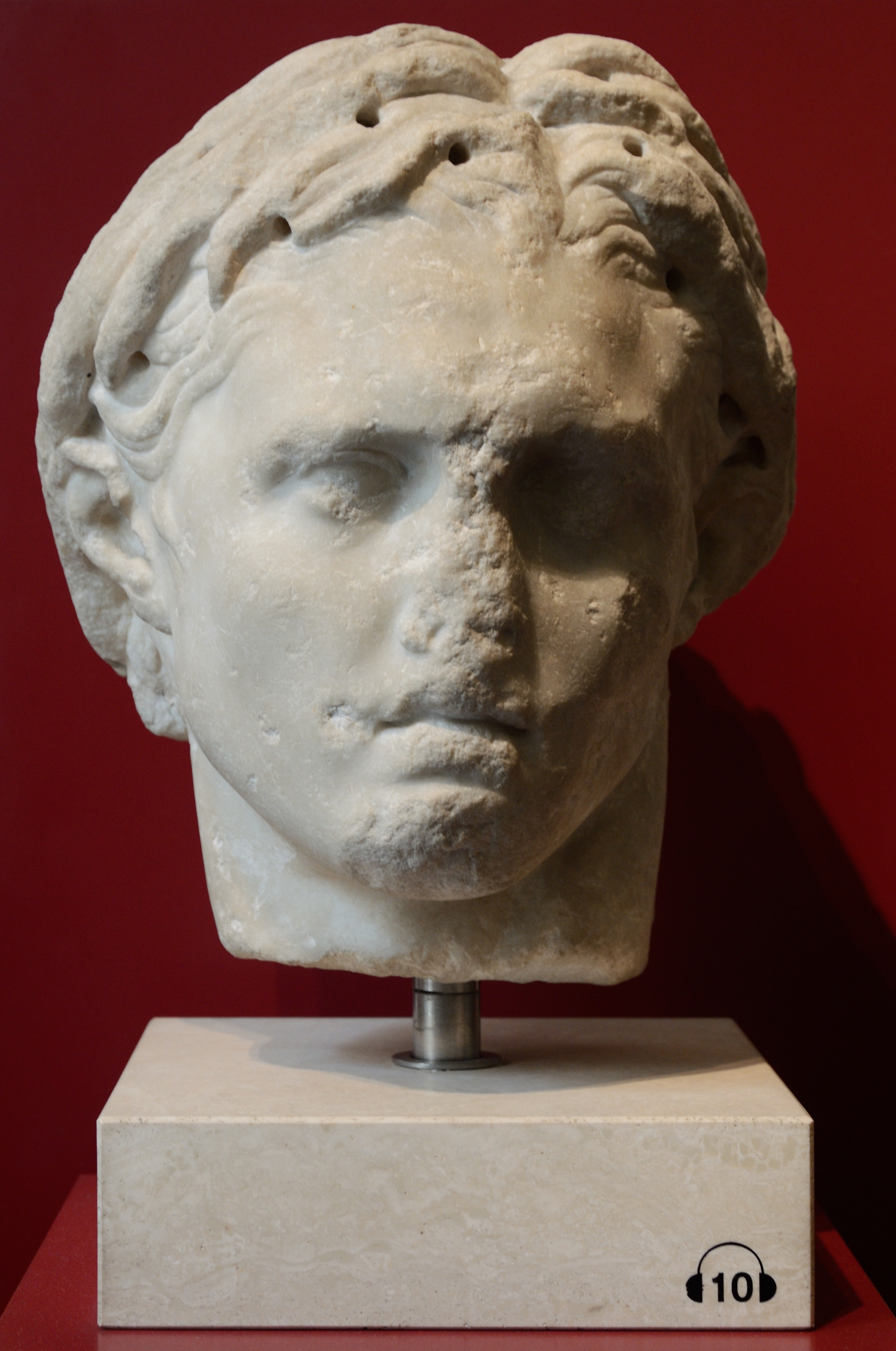
Head of Alexander the Great (from Tivoli; Temple of Hercules; inv. 124.507)

The arrangement of the portraits one behind the other is reminiscent of the galleries of illustrious Greeks that often furnished Roman domus, used as exempla (examples of behavior).

There is also along the gallery a depiction of a cat catching a bird (upper part) and two ducks in the lower part, from a villa along the Via Ardeatina (first century B.C.) with very small tiles (opus vermiculatum). The subject and technique are in the Hellenistic tradition.

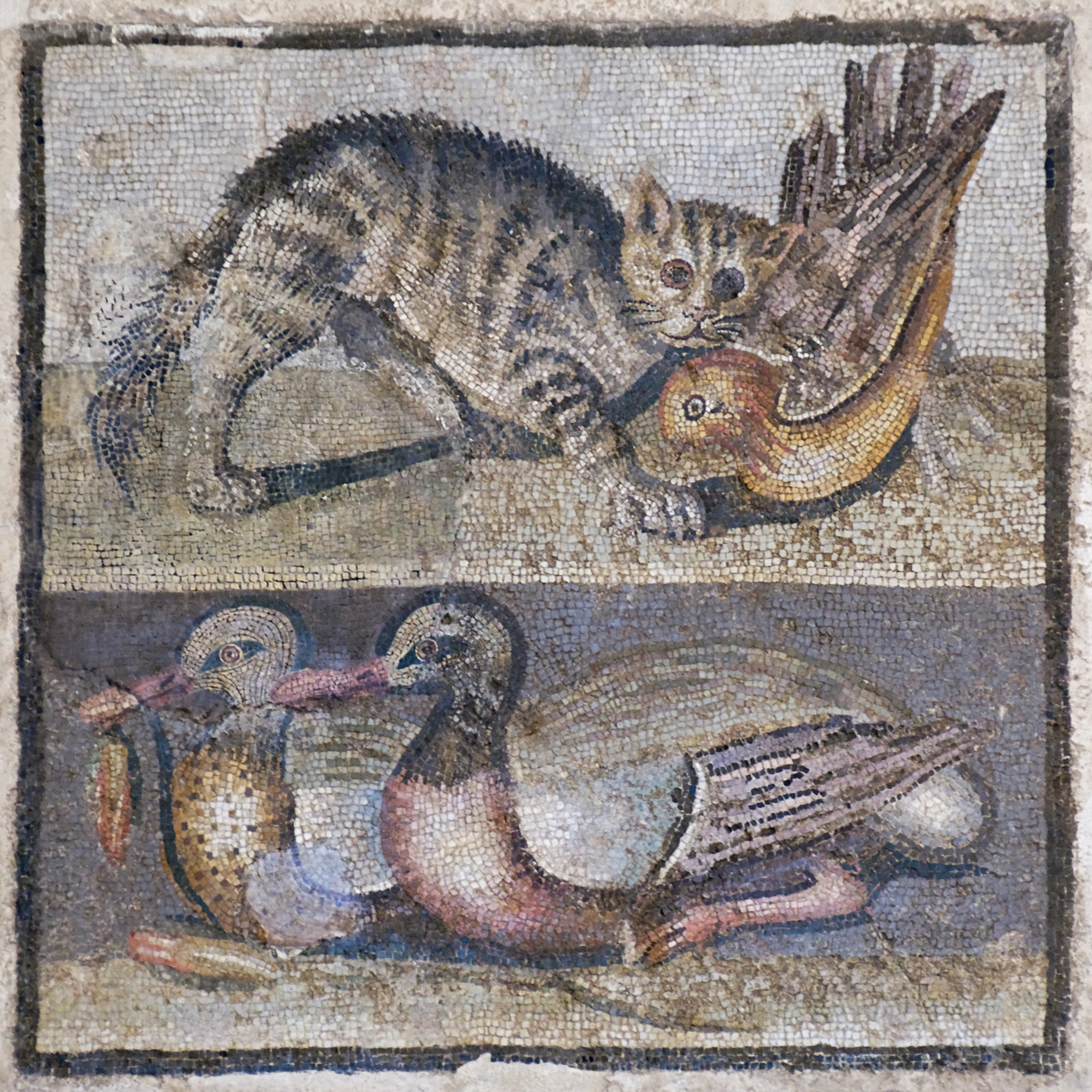
Central panel of a floor mosaic with a cat and two ducks

=== Room VI (ground floor) ===
On display in "Room VI" are two works of Greek art that decorated the Horti Sallustiani, a property that was first owned by Gaius Julius Caesar, then by Gaius Sallustius Crispus, and finally by the imperial family, as evidence of the Roman civilization's love for Hellenic art. Many of the masterpieces found in the area, and which came from the Ludovisi collection, are now on display at the Roman National Museum in Palazzo Altemps. A couple, however, are displayed in this room of the Palazzo Massimo. They are:

- Niobid from the Horti Sallustiani, found during excavations in 1906, in a cubicle 11 meters below ground level, perhaps hidden to protect it from the destructive fury of the barbarians during the invasions of the fifth century AD. It depicts one of Niobe's daughters in the act of falling to the ground, having been wounded by an arrow lodged between her shoulder blades, and which she tries in vain to extract. The work is original and can be ascribed to the fifth century B.C.E., as it is believed to belong to or otherwise be analogous to the figures in the pediment of the temple of Apollo at Eretria, which were transferred to Rome at the behest of Augustus. The Niobid from the Horti Sallustiani would thus be one of the very many works brought to Rome from Greece as spoils of war, which played such a large part in the evolution of the taste and style of Roman artistic production.
- Part of an original statue of Peplophoros, depicting a maiden wearing a peplos (the heavy Doric female costume, which was developed in Greece from 480 BC). It was discovered in Piazza Barberini. This genre of subject matter was also highly prized by Roman sculpture. Peplophoros is believed to have Magno-Greek or Siceliot origins (dated around the years 470-460 BCE), although it cannot be ruled out a priori that it may be a Classicist reworking.
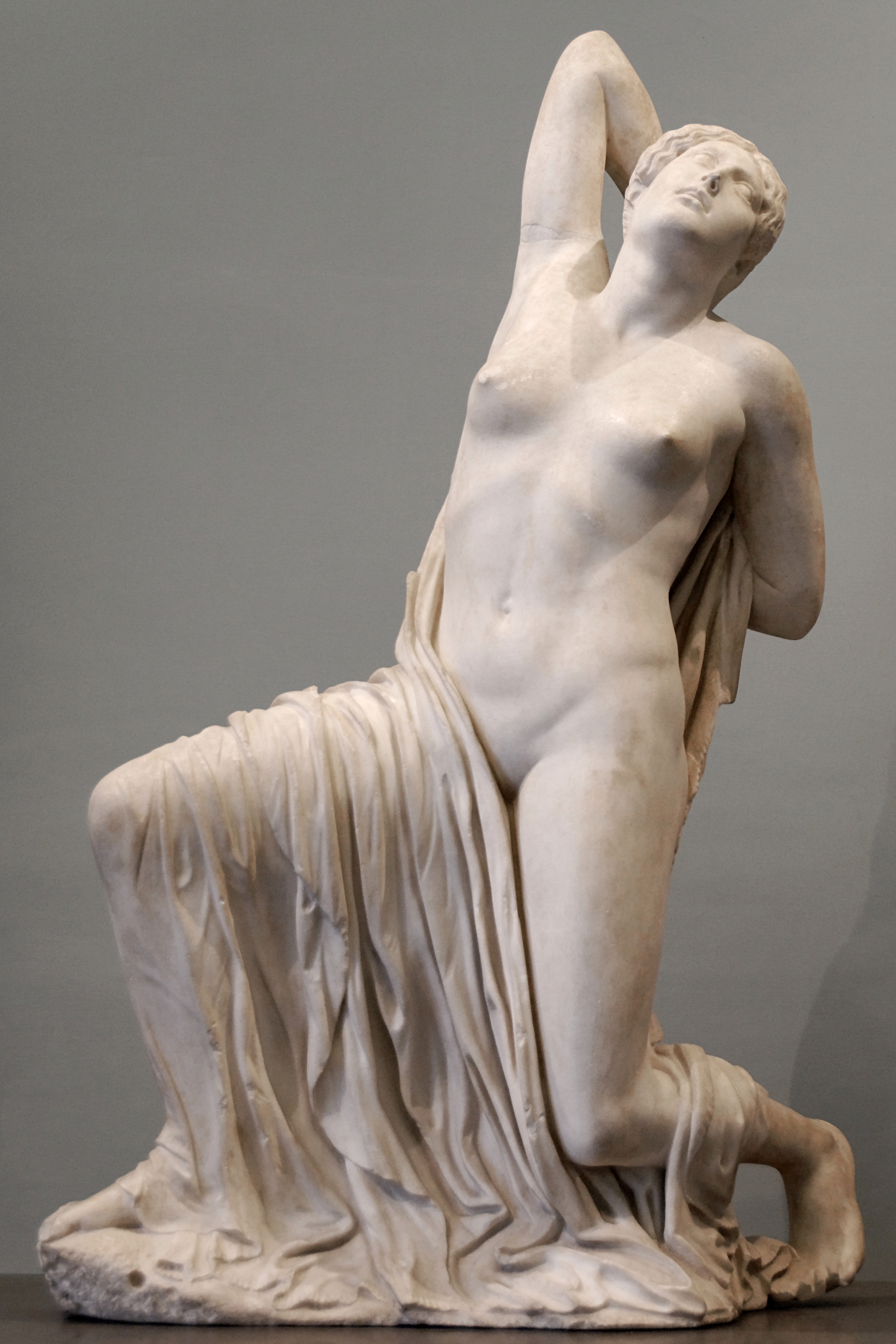
Niobid of the Horti Sallustiani

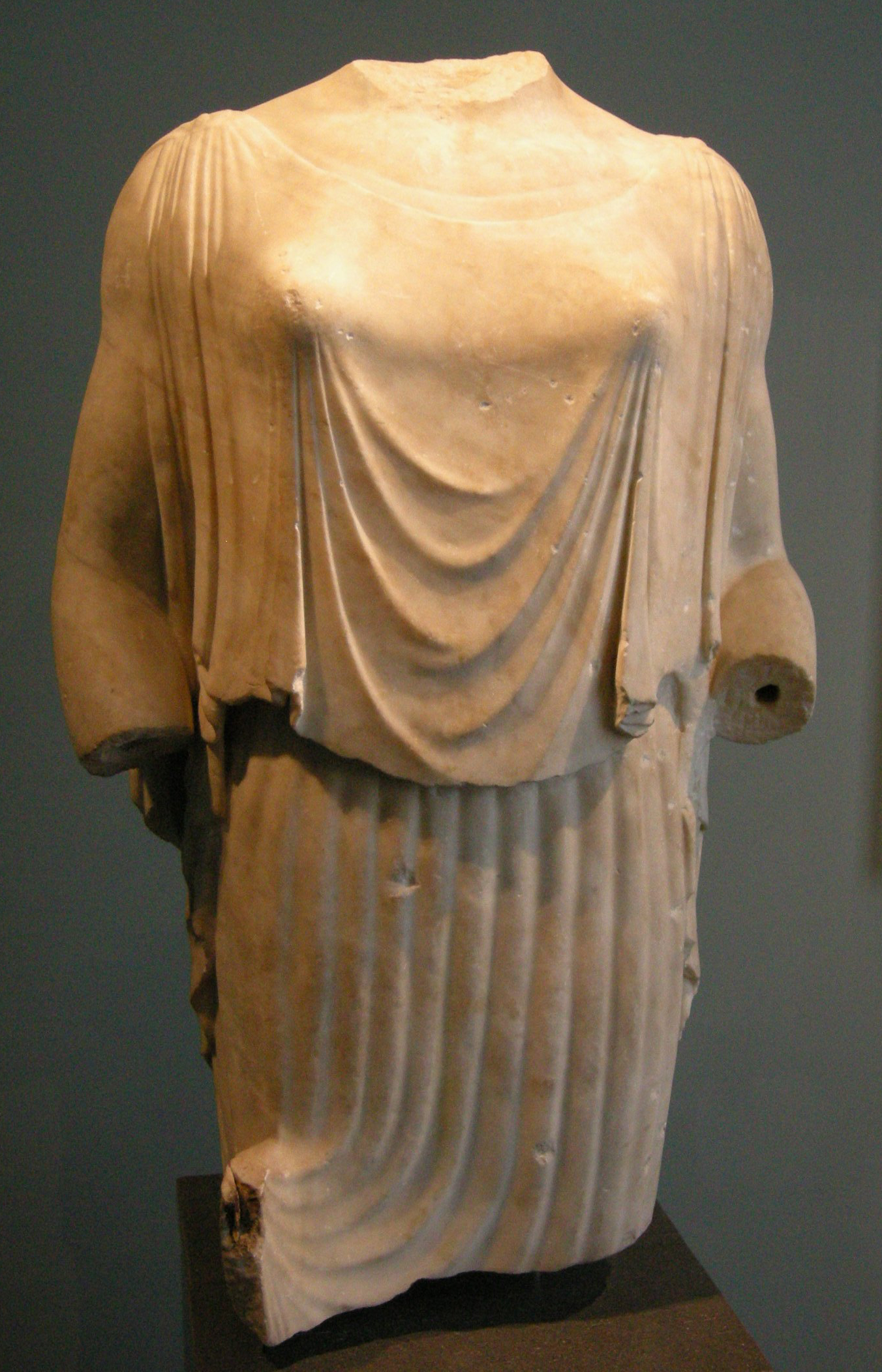
Statue of maiden wearing a peplos (the heavy Doric costume) found in Piazza Barberini (Greek original 470 BC).

=== Room VII (ground floor) ===
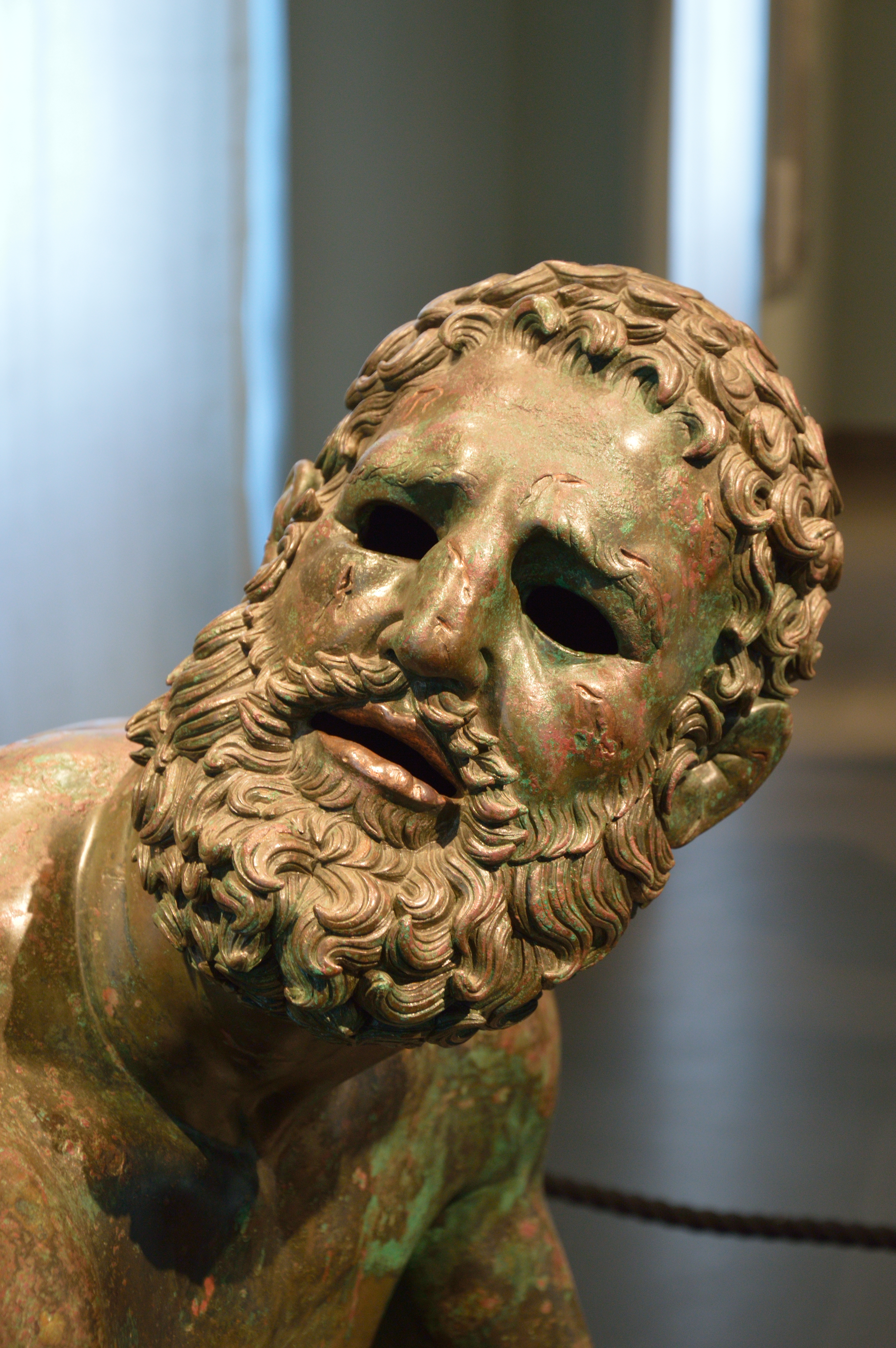
Detail of the face of the "Boxer at Rest"

Bronze statues previously placed in the Octagonal Hall of the Baths of Diocletian (the Boxer at Rest and the Hellenistic Prince) are displayed there.

The bronze statue of the Boxer at Rest is a Greek sculpture, dated to the second half of the 4th century B.C. and attributed to Lysippos or his immediate circle; found in Rome on the slopes of the Quirinal in 1885, it is preserved in the National Museum of Rome (inv. 1055).

The statue of the Hellenistic prince depicts a young man, completely naked, leaning on a spear held in his left hand. His right hand is resting on his right buttock. The statue was discovered on the Quirinal and may have come from a private residence and not from the Baths of Constantine. The realistic features of the face have generated much discussion among scholars without reaching a definitive solution, however, oscillating between a Pergamene prince, a member of the Roman nobilitas, and a victorious general (perhaps Roman) who had fought under the protection of Hercules (as the pose of the sculpture itself seems to indicate).

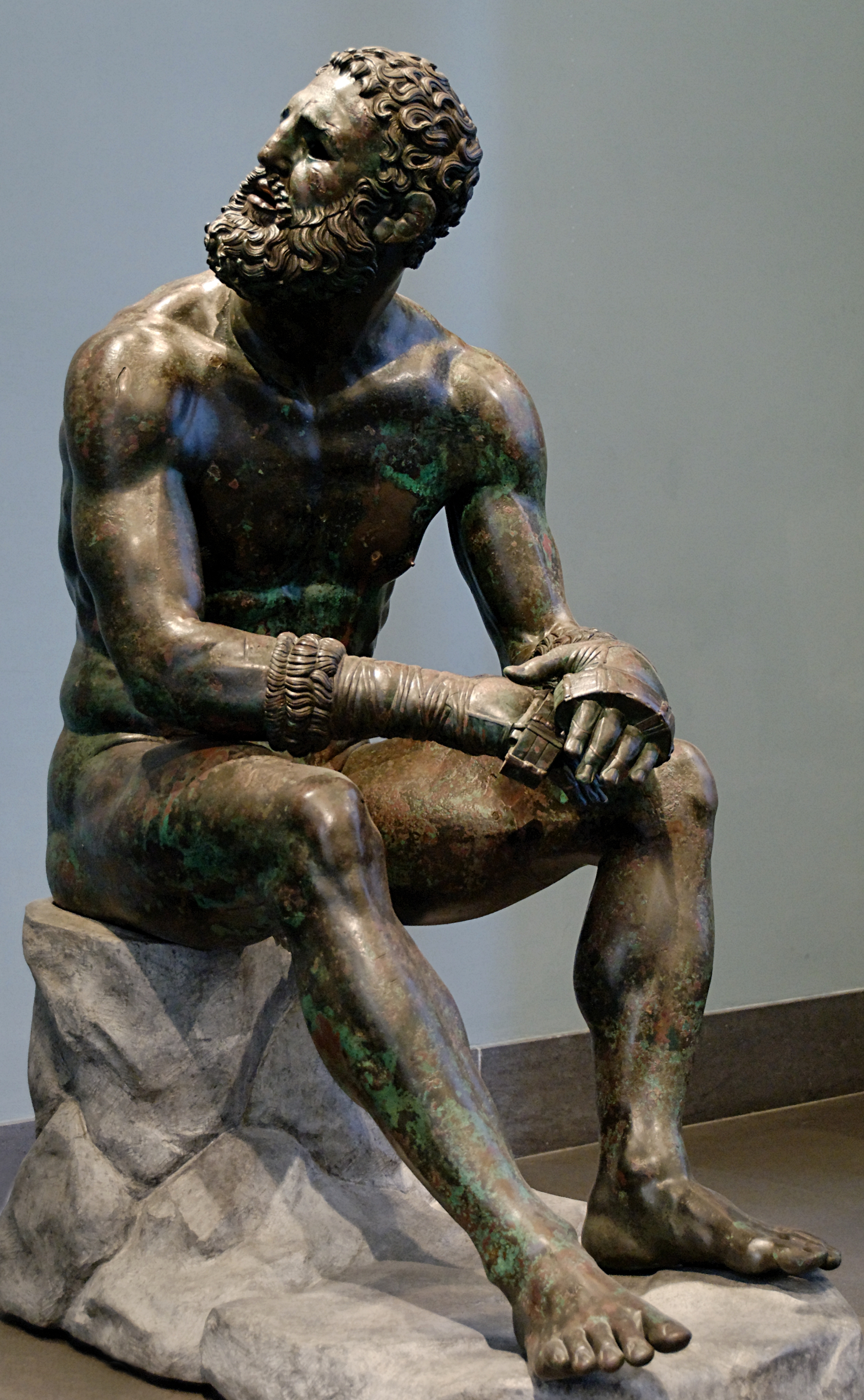
The Boxer at Rest

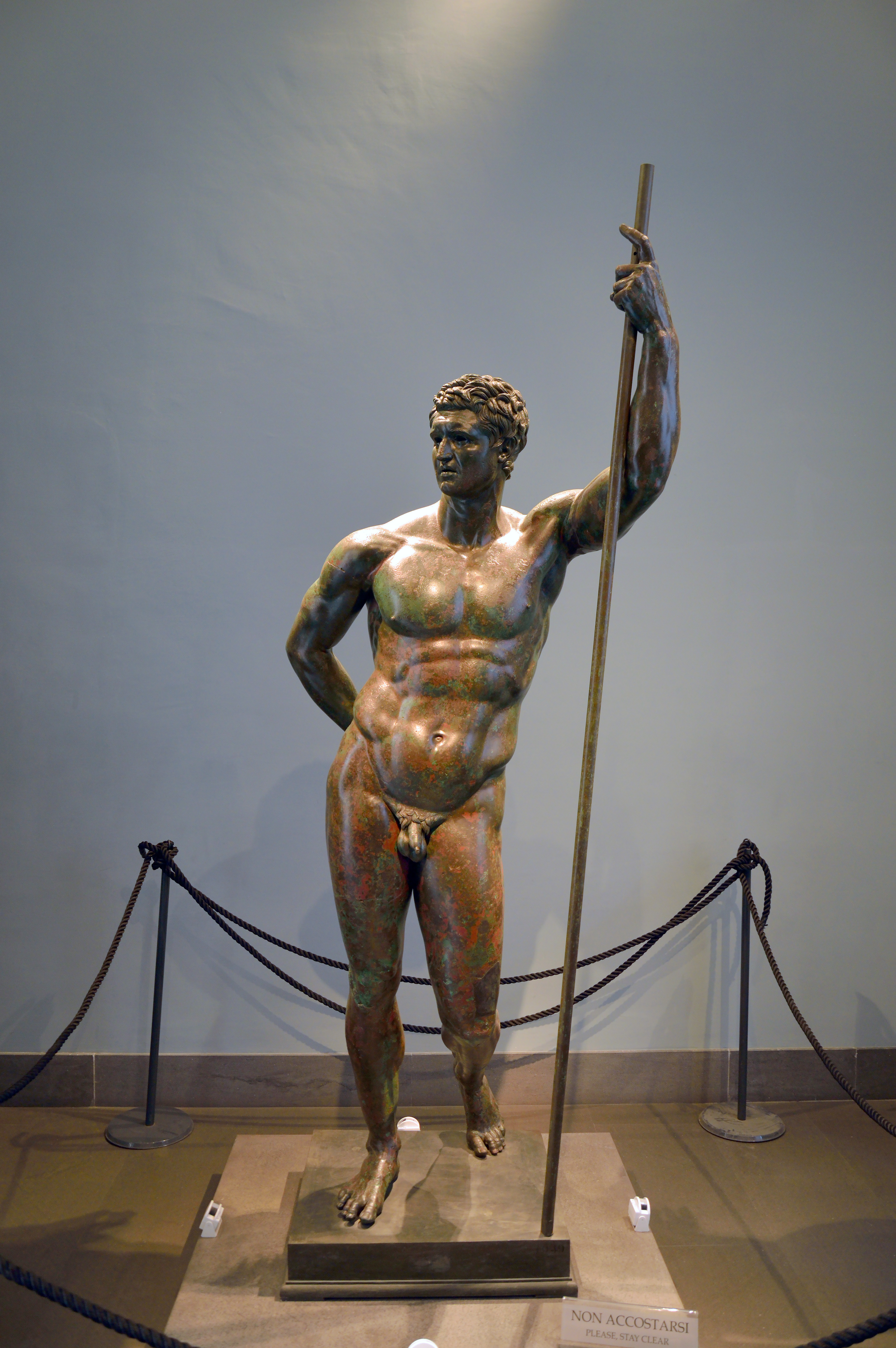
Statue of a prince of the Seleucid dynasty

=== Room VIII (ground floor) ===
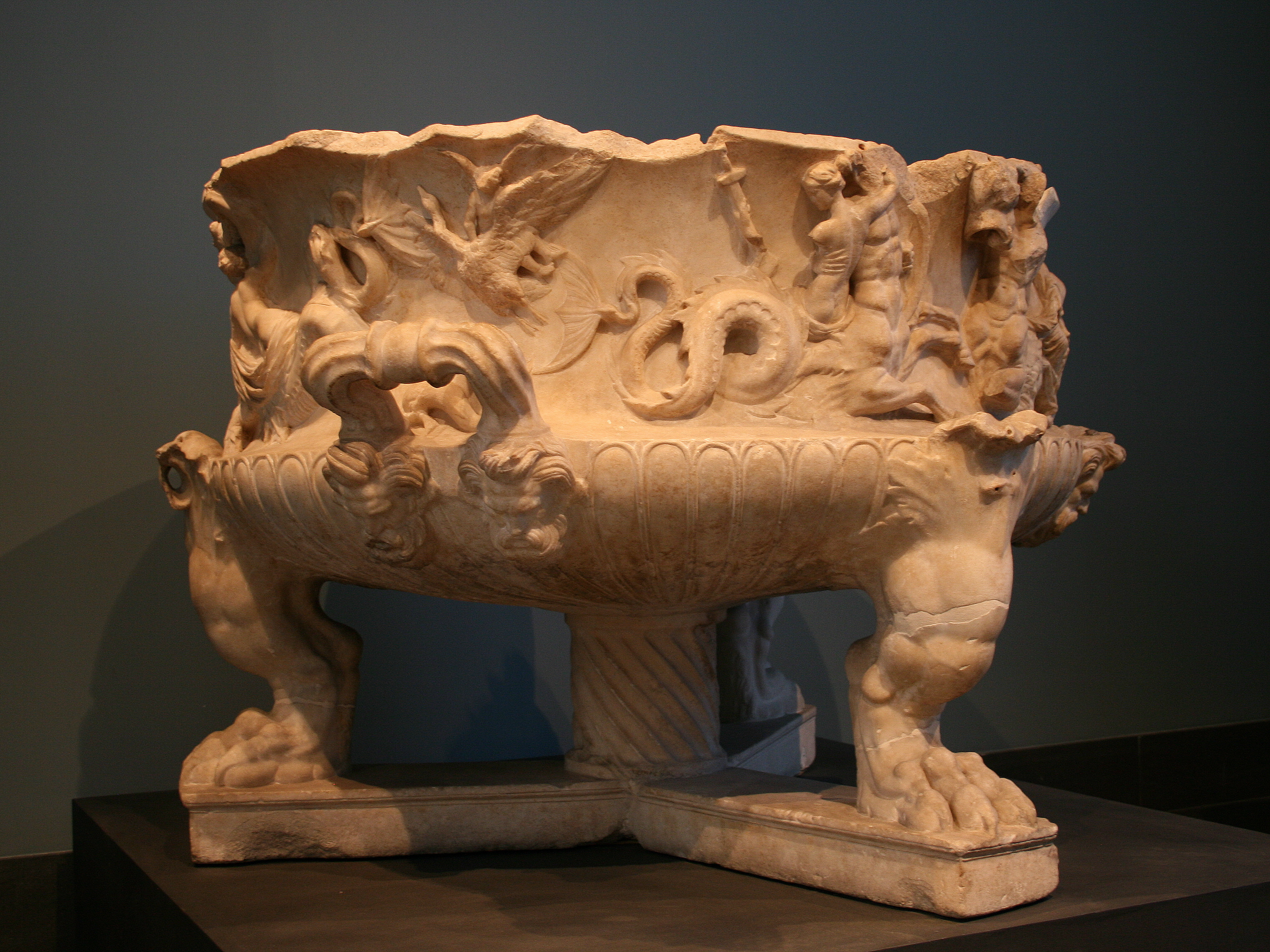
Neo-Attic vase belonging to a fountain perhaps from the Horti Agrippinae.

On display in "Room VIII" are a number of masterpieces from the workshops of Neo-Attic sculptors (from the 2nd century BC), ready to put them on the market for the refined Roman collectors of the nobilitas. They represent copies or reworkings of classical models. They were used to decorate urban residences or the villas of the most important families of the senatorial or equestrian order, so that they could emphasize their own Hellenistic-style culture. This phenomenon of assimilation of Hellenistic culture manifested itself with the elaboration of new architectural perspectives and a new taste for decorating the dwellings of private citizens of the most prominent gentes of ancient Rome. This phenomenon had begun with the seizure of important Hellenized cities, such as Taras (272 B.C.) and Syracuse (212 B.C.), becoming increasingly decisive when Roman armies occupied the Kingdom of Macedonia and Ancient Greece (2nd century B.C.). Not surprisingly, the Greek historian Plutarch writes in the life of Marcus Claudius Marcellus:

Marcellus, summoned by fellow citizens to intervene in the war that was taking place almost at the gates of Rome, took with him when he left most of the objects found as offerings in the temples of Syracuse. He intended to display them during his triumph and to beautify Rome. The city up to that time had not and did not know anything more elegant, pleasant, and exquisite, having not yet appreciated such gracefulness.

— Plutarch, Life of Marcellus, 21).

Statues of deities such as Athena, the sculptor Menophantos' Aphrodite, the neo-Attic base with Maenads (1st century B.C.), as well as a Melpomene Muse (?) that were normally placed in gardens (horti) are collected.

Another interesting sculpture is a grand Pentelic marble cup supported by feral paws. It was found on the Lungotevere in Sassia near the Hospital of the Holy Spirit (in the area of the Horti Agrippinae). It must have been part of a grandiose fountain. The surface outer part of the basin is decorated with an Eros on a winged swan, groups of Nereids and Sea Centaurs carrying Achilles' weapons. The figures are late Hellenistic in style and thus datable to the first decades of the first century BCE.

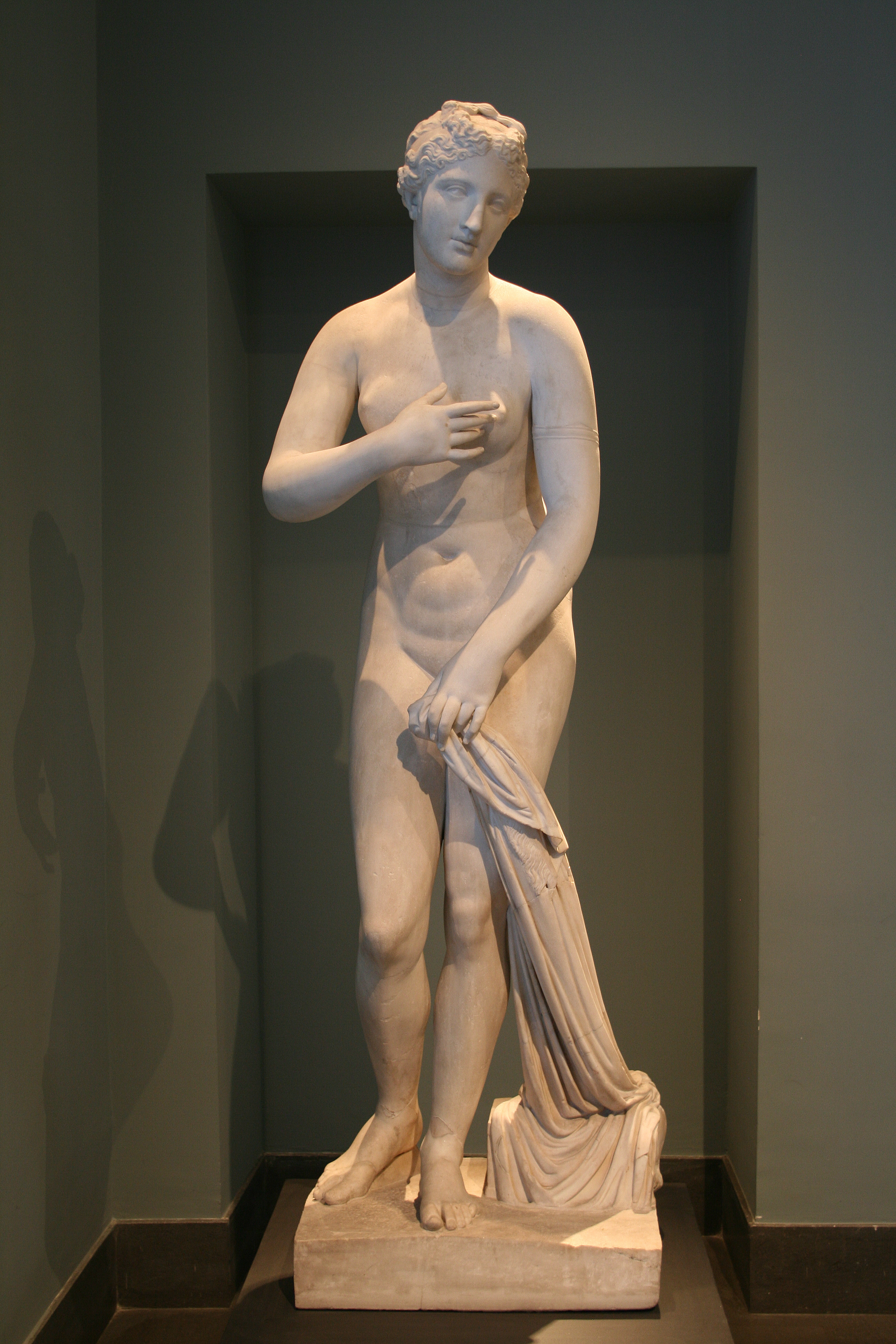
Aphrodite of Menophantos

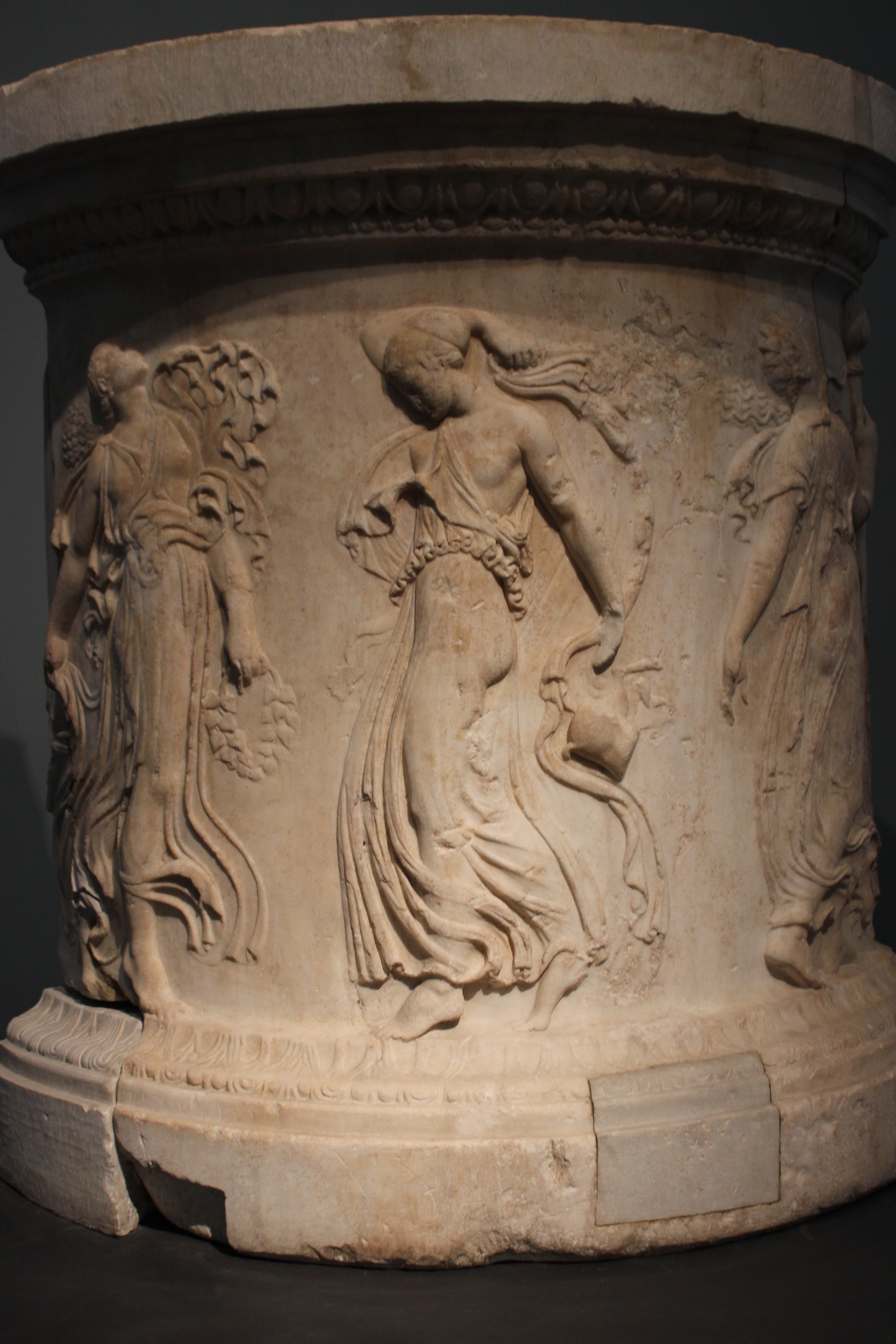
Base with dancing maenads (Parian marble; Sciarra collection; inv. 2.001.482)

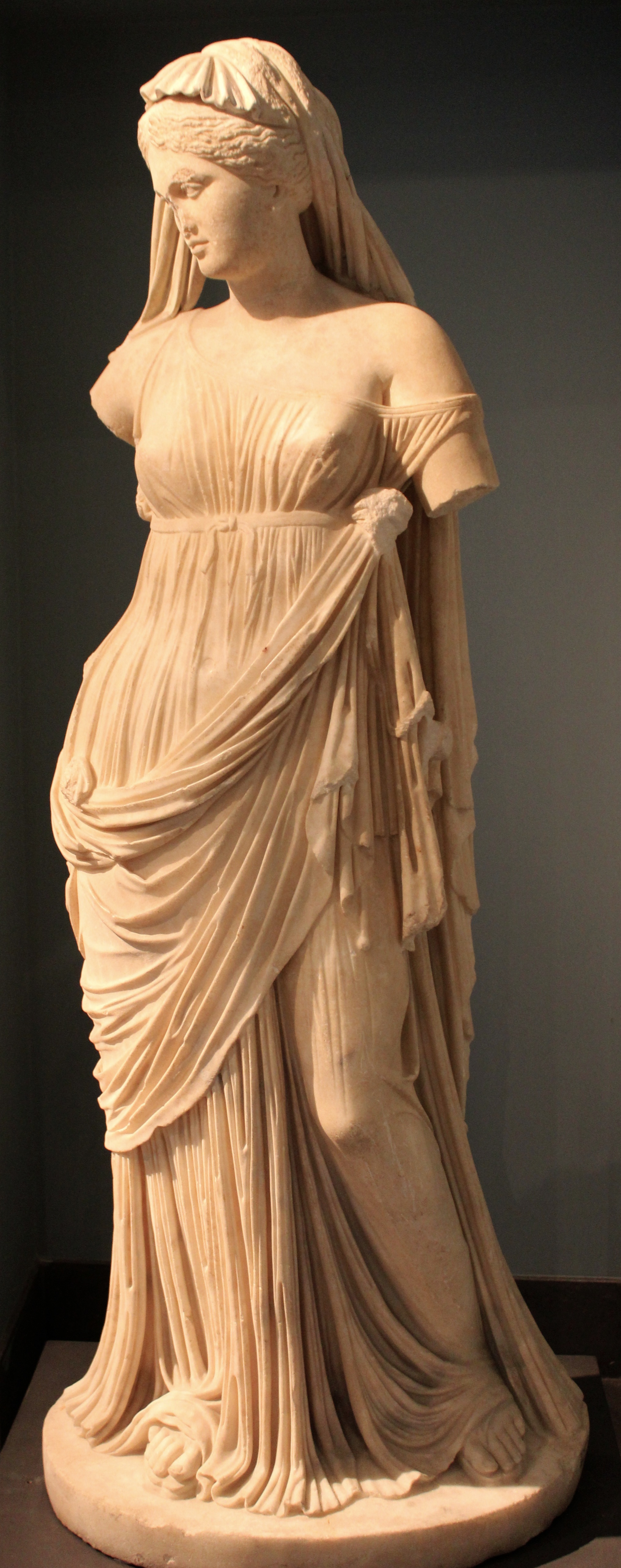
Melpomene Muse

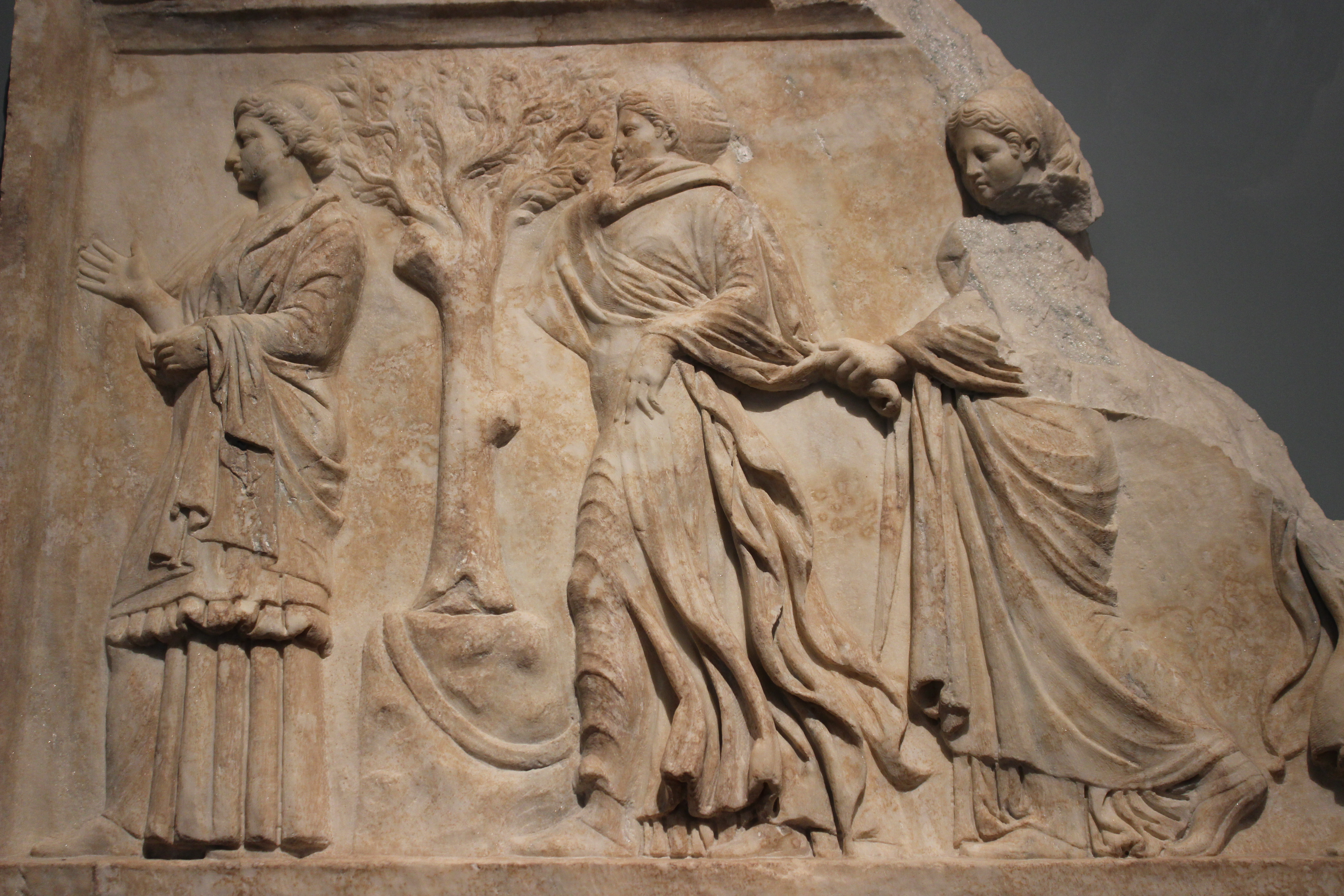
Nymphs (inv. 126.374; Barberini Square; 1st century AD).

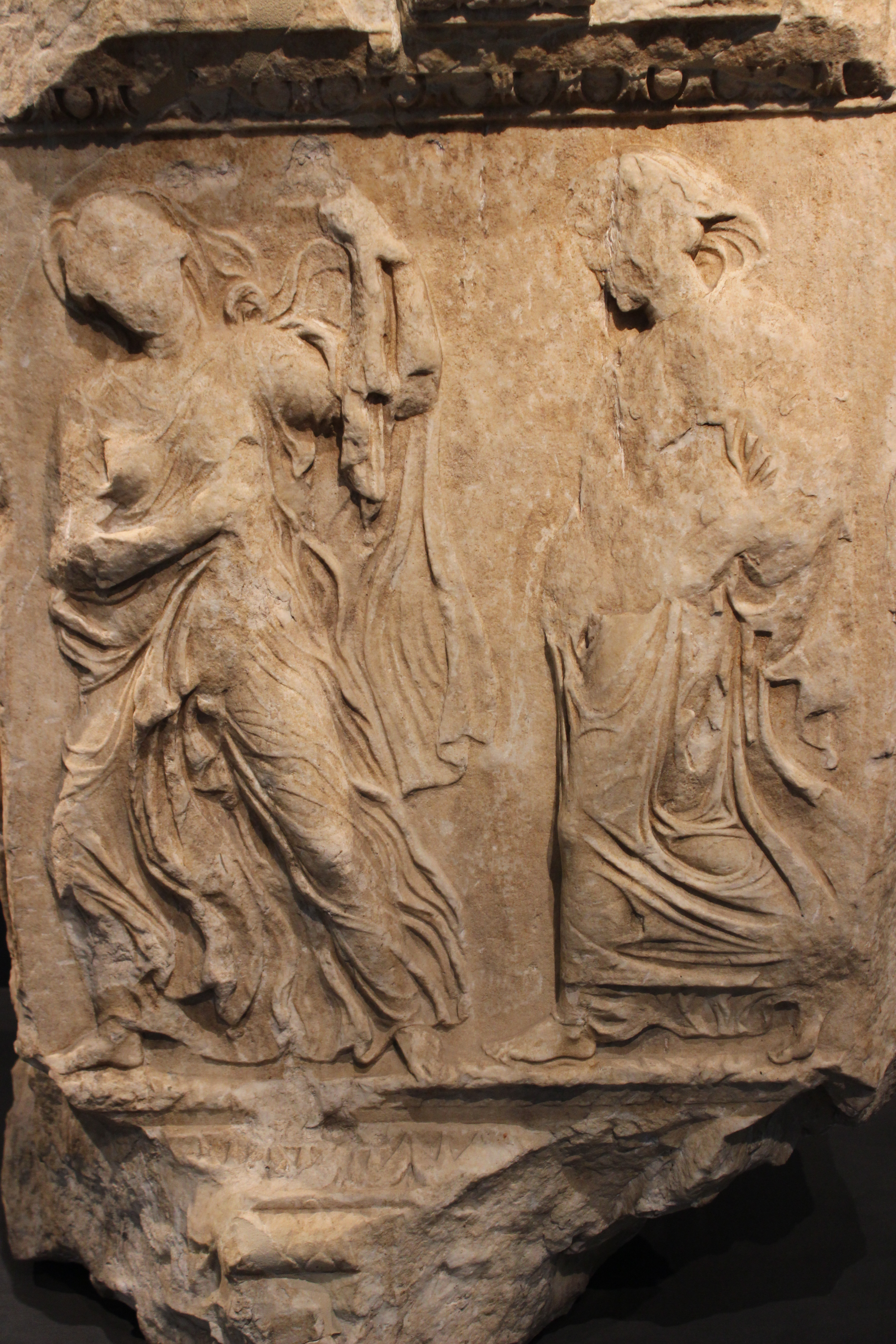
Altar with Aglaurids and Muses from Mentana (late 1st century BC).

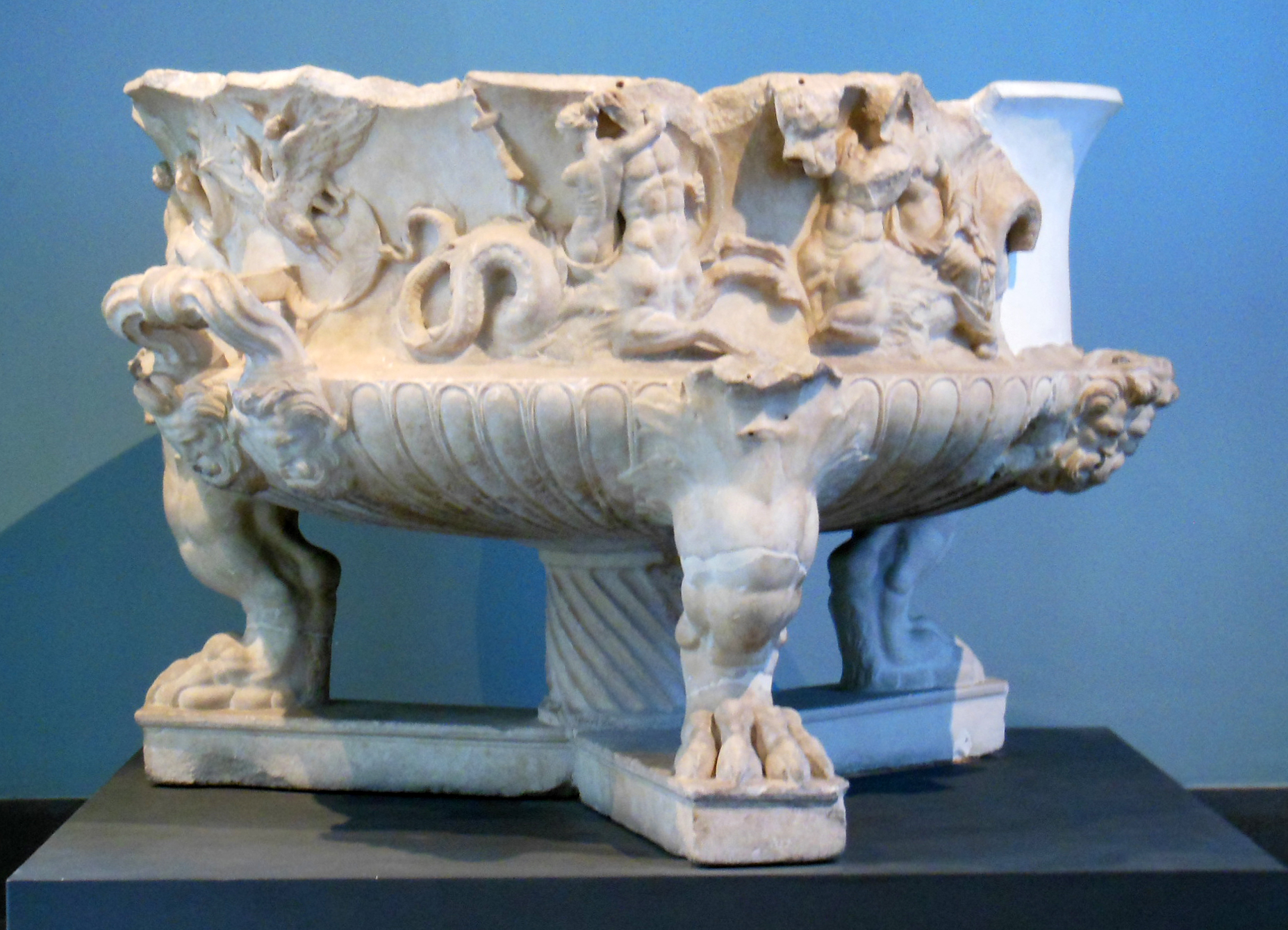
Different angle of the Neo-Attic vase

== First floor ==
The first floor is reached by a wide staircase where statues (copies or reworkings from Greek originals) of the most important deities of the Roman-Greek religion from the villas of Latium are displayed in some niches: Jupiter, Apollo, Dionysus, and Athena.

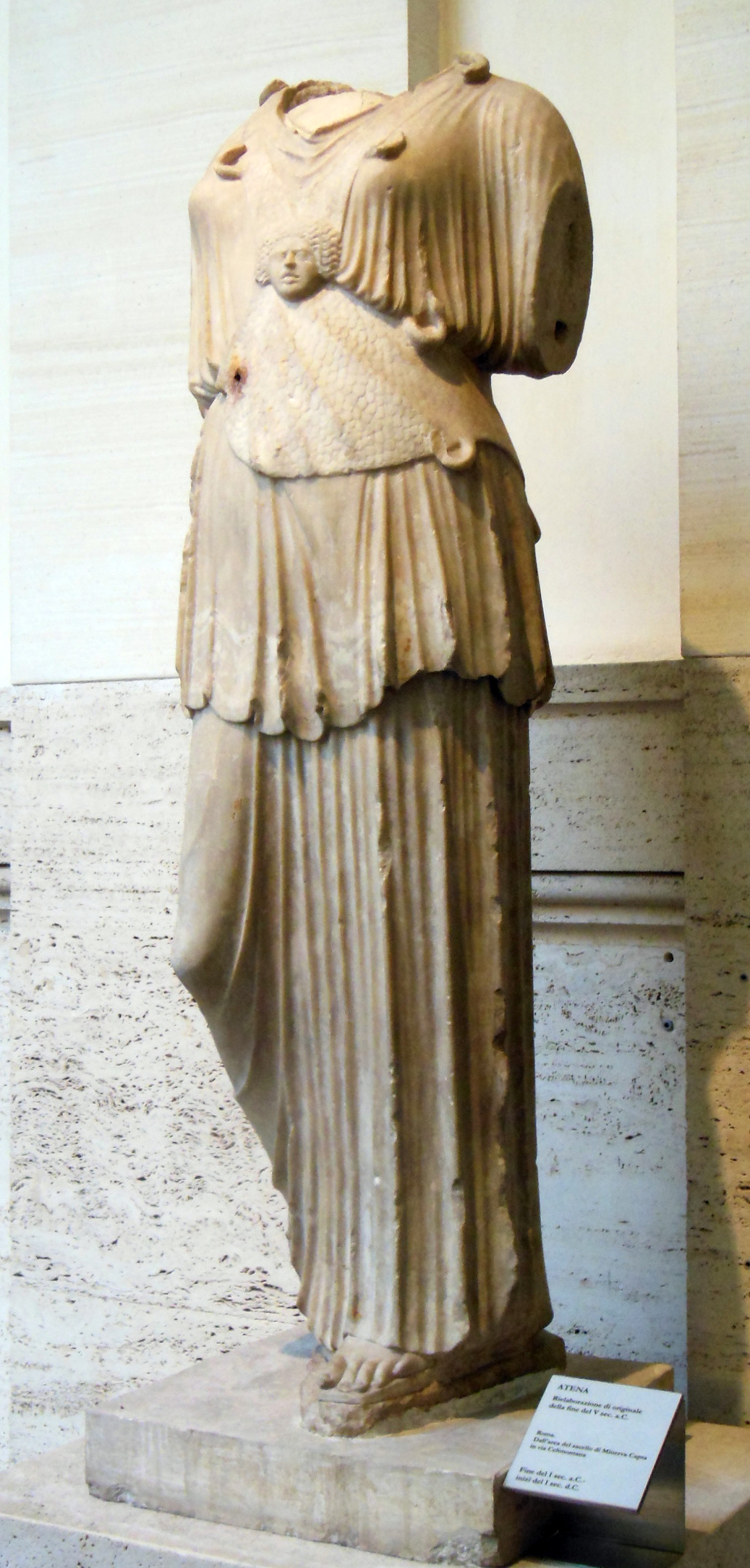
Athena Celimontana along the entrance staircase to the upper and basement floors.

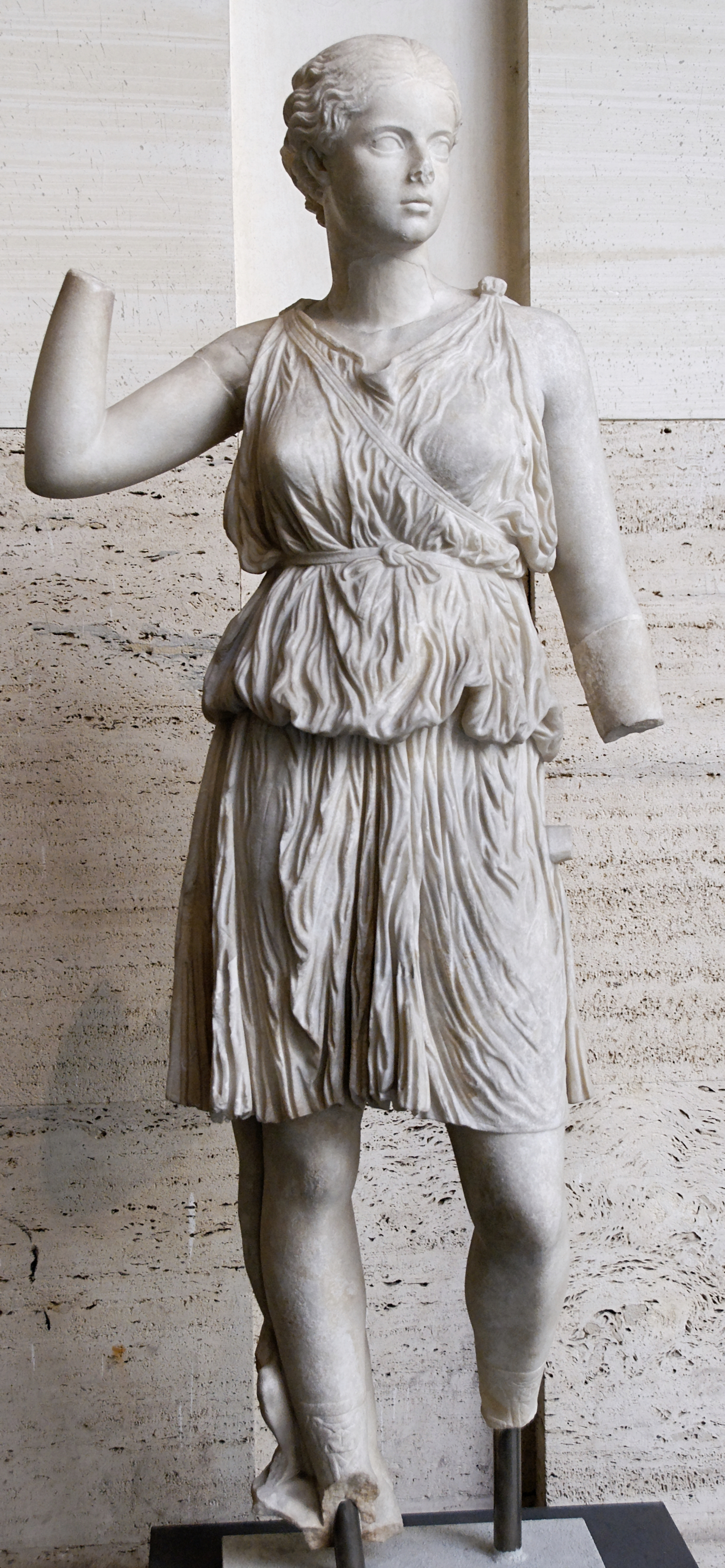
A young Artemis

On display are masterpieces of Roman statuary, from the age of the Flavians to late antiquity, as well as numerous sarcophagi, both pagan and Christian, including the sarcophagus of Portonaccio. In a large hall, the ancient "hall of masterpieces" of the "Museum of the Baths" is repurposed, displaying some important works on "ideal" sculpture, used as valuable furnishings of villas of the Roman aristocracy, such as the Crouching Venus, two copies of the Discobolus and some Greek originals (including the Maiden of Anzio).

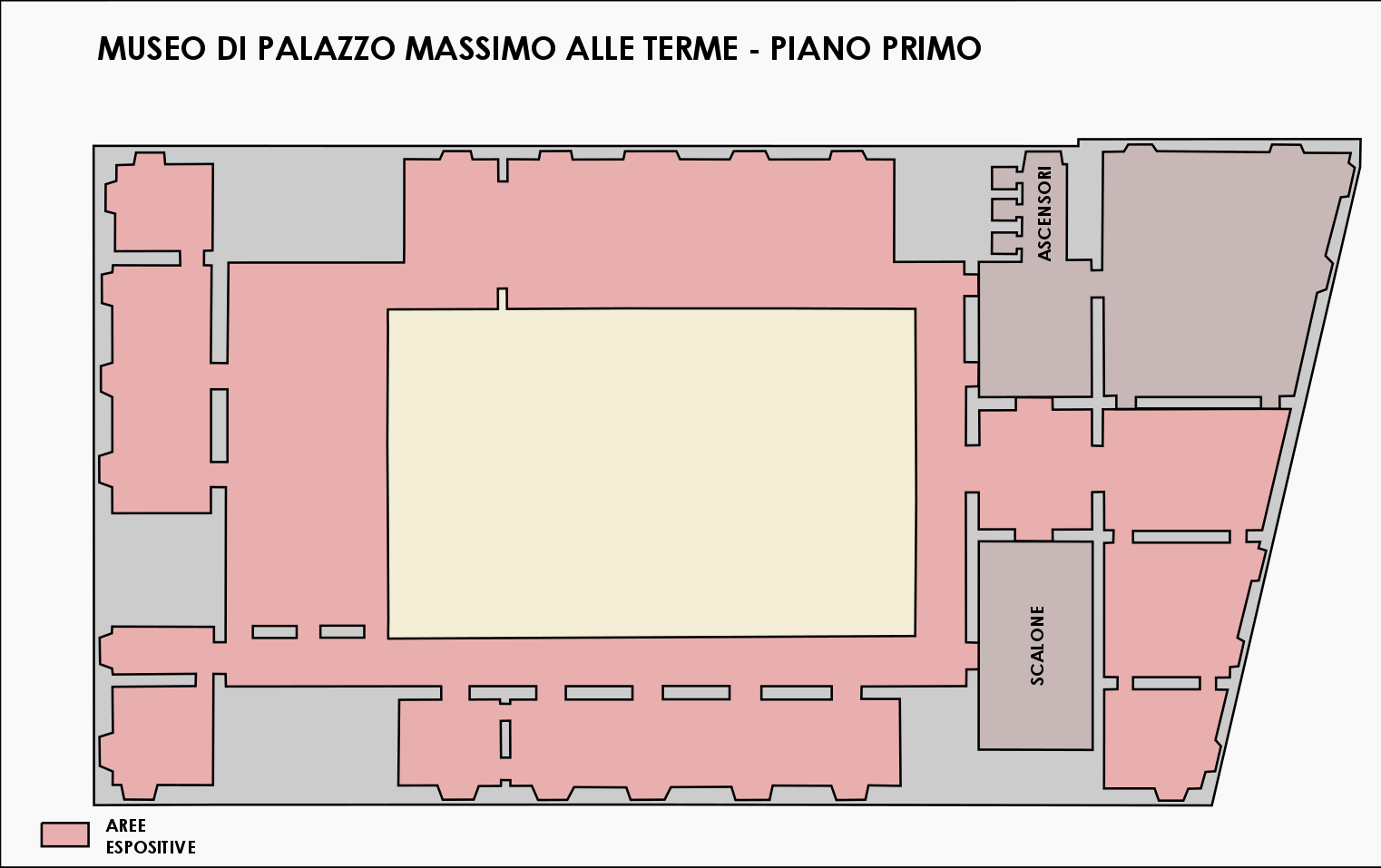
Floor plan of the first floor of the Roman National Museum at the Palazzo Massimo

=== Gallery I (first floor) ===
In "Gallery I" are found numerous portraits from Hadrian's Villa, the imperial residence commissioned and built by Hadrian in Tivoli. On display are some of the portraits of his successors: from Marcus Aurelius, found in the Golden Square, to Bruttia Crispina, the wife of Commodus, to Caracalla in his mature years (212-217 A.D.), whose image departs from that of the Antonine dynasty, having a short beard, a sullen face and a slight twist of the face to the left to recall the portrait of Alexander the Great.

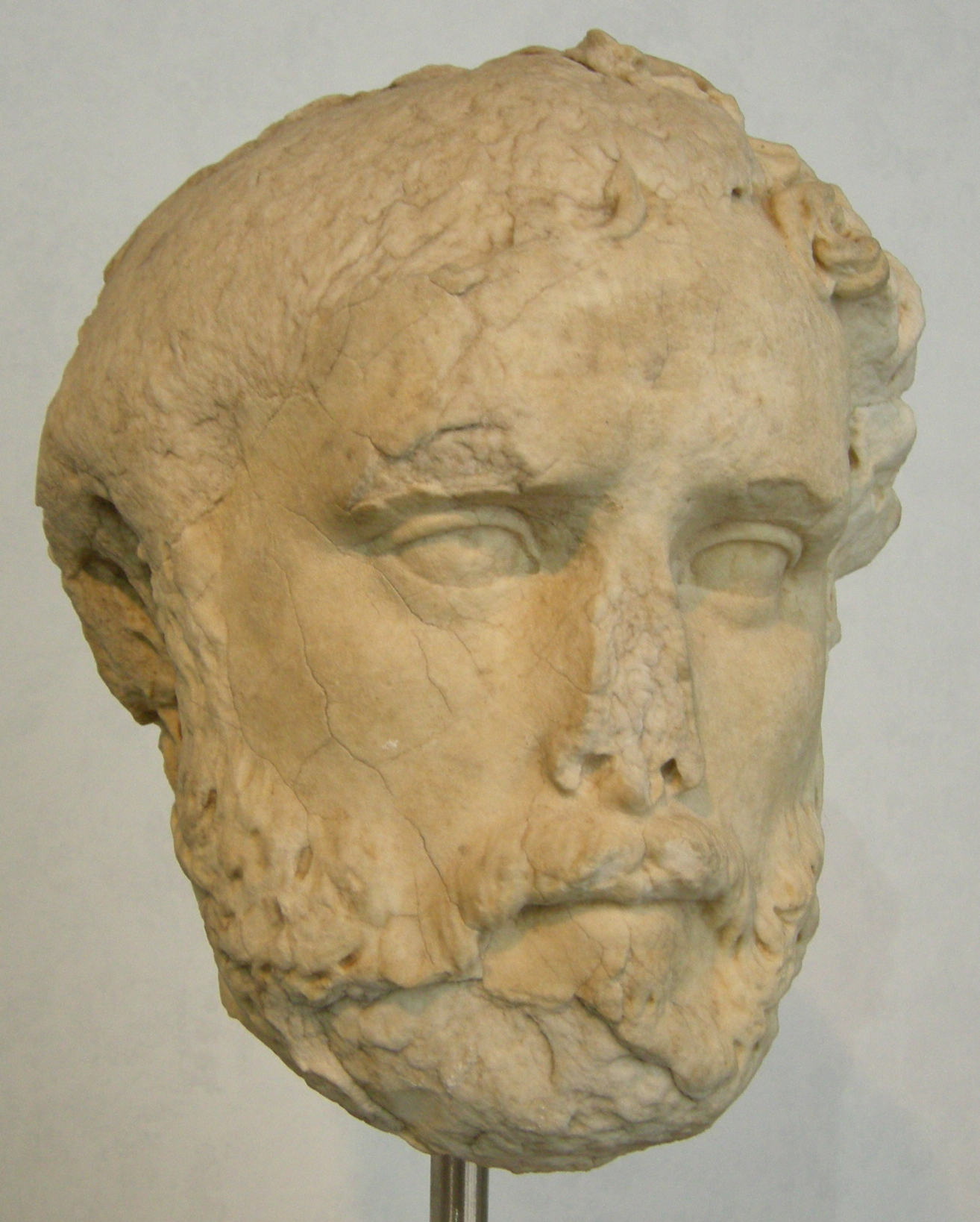
Portrait of Antoninus Pius from Hadrian's Villa

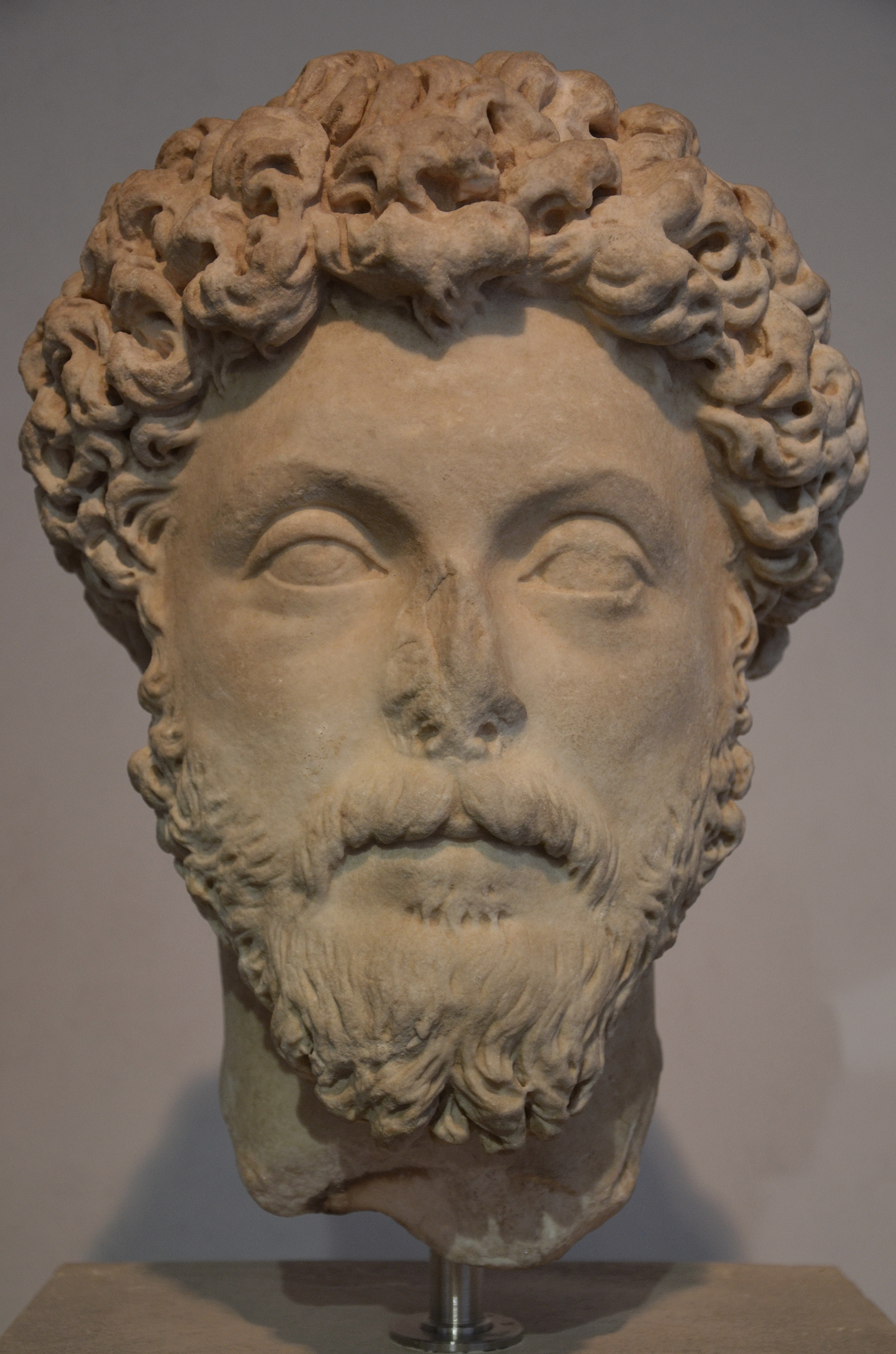
Portrait of Marcus Aurelius from Hadrian's Villa

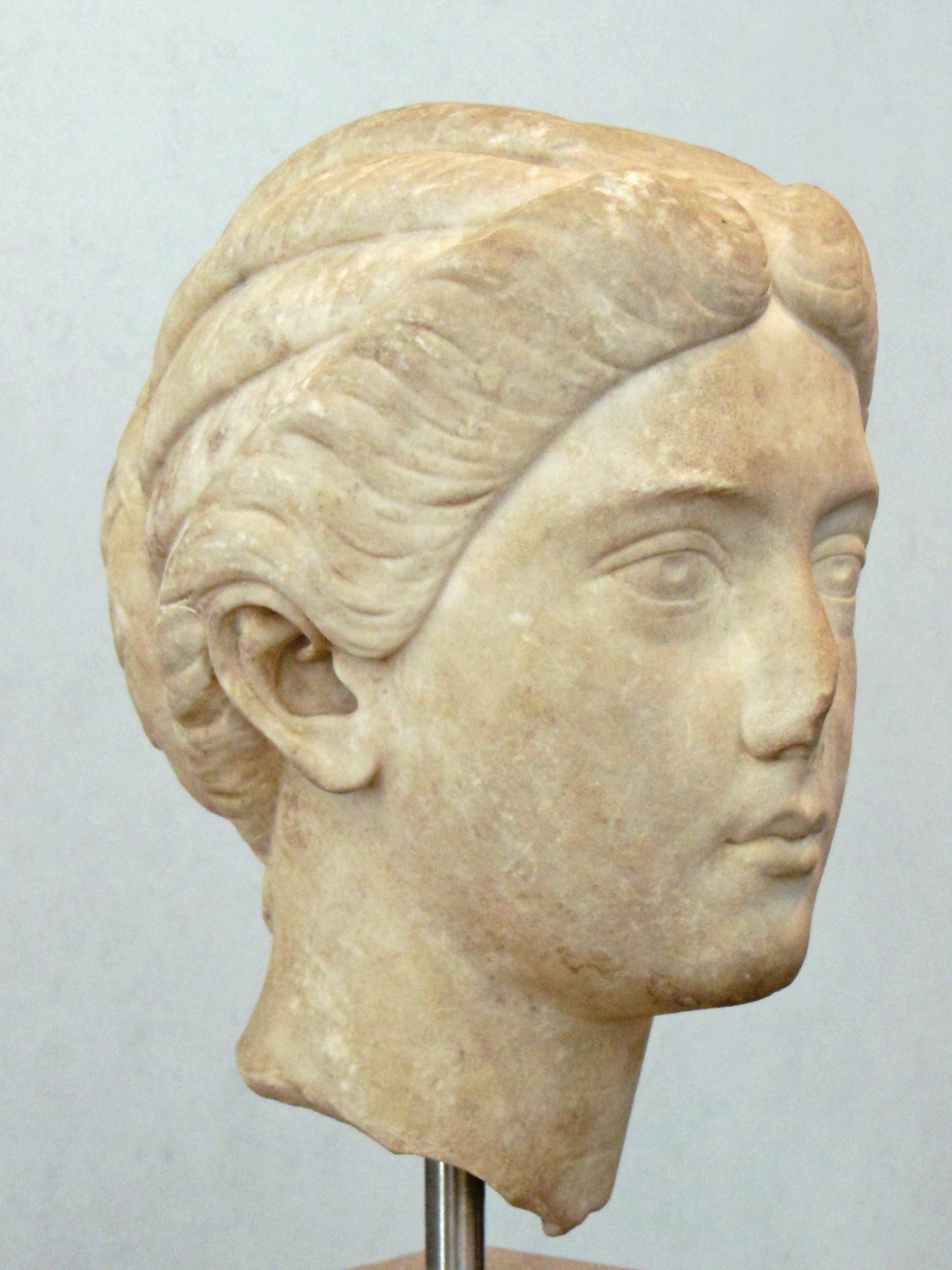
Portrait of Bruttia Crispina from Hadrian's Villa

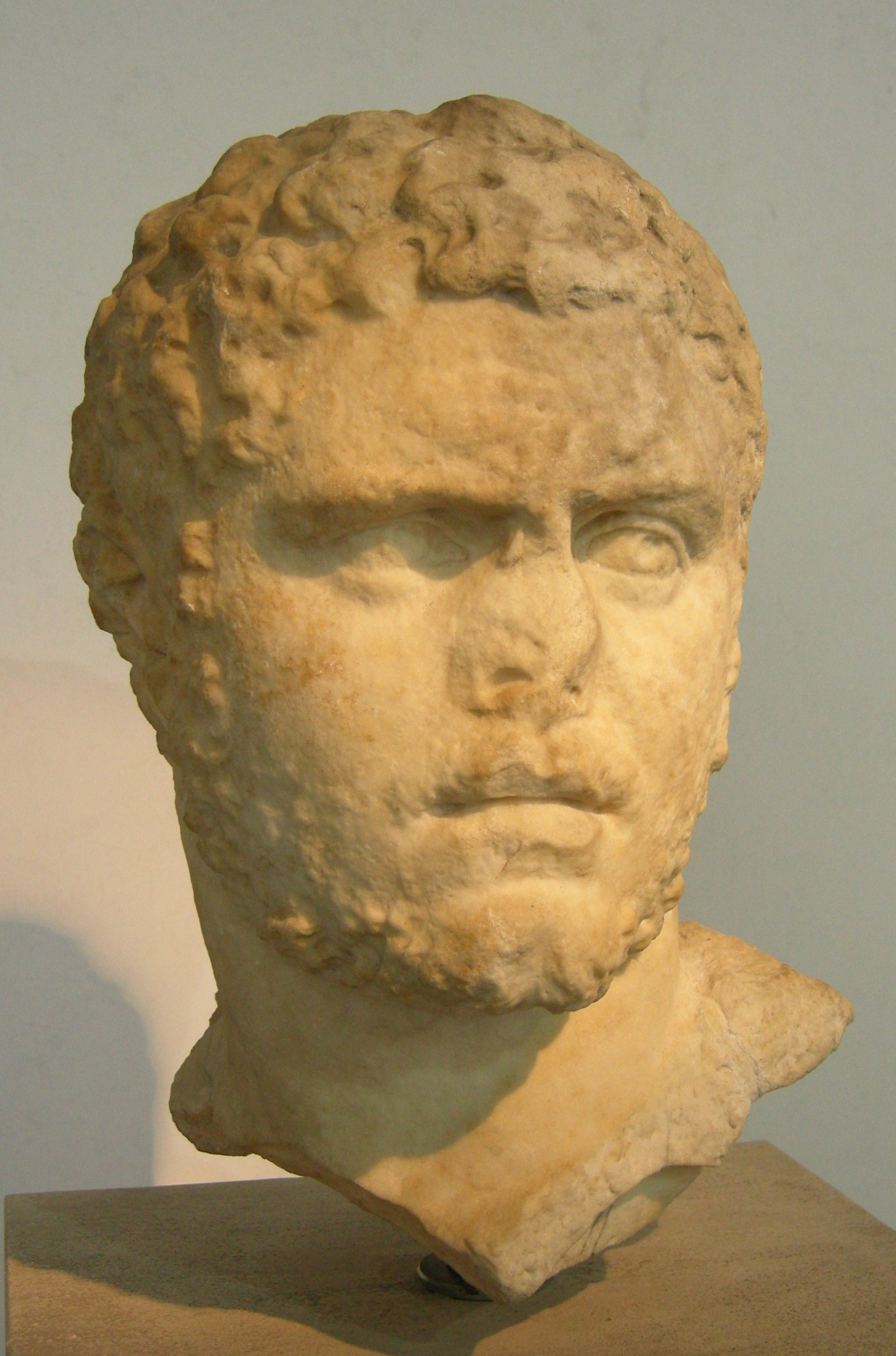
Bust of Caracalla from Hadrian's Villa

=== Room I (first floor) ===
According to a phenomenon that could already be seen on the ground floor regarding the Julio-Claudian dynasty, the central power increasingly used the medium of iconography for propaganda and publicity purposes.

"Room I" contains works devoted to the image of the Flavian emperors (69-96 A.D.), Vespasian, Titus and Domitian, and of Nerva (96-98), who initiated the adoptive emperors (96-192). Among these portraits, one of the most important is that of Vespasian, found in the Tiber (inv. 53), which belongs to the realist current, so cherished in the late republican period, in which the emperor is depicted old and wrinkled, in contrast to what had happened after the classicism of the Julio-Claudian age. The significance of this change in the style of this ruler is explained as a return to the ancient values of the mos maiorum of the Republican period. By contrast, with his son, Domitian, there is a return to pro-Hellenism.

One of the most valuable statuary works in this room is that of Julia, daughter of Titus.

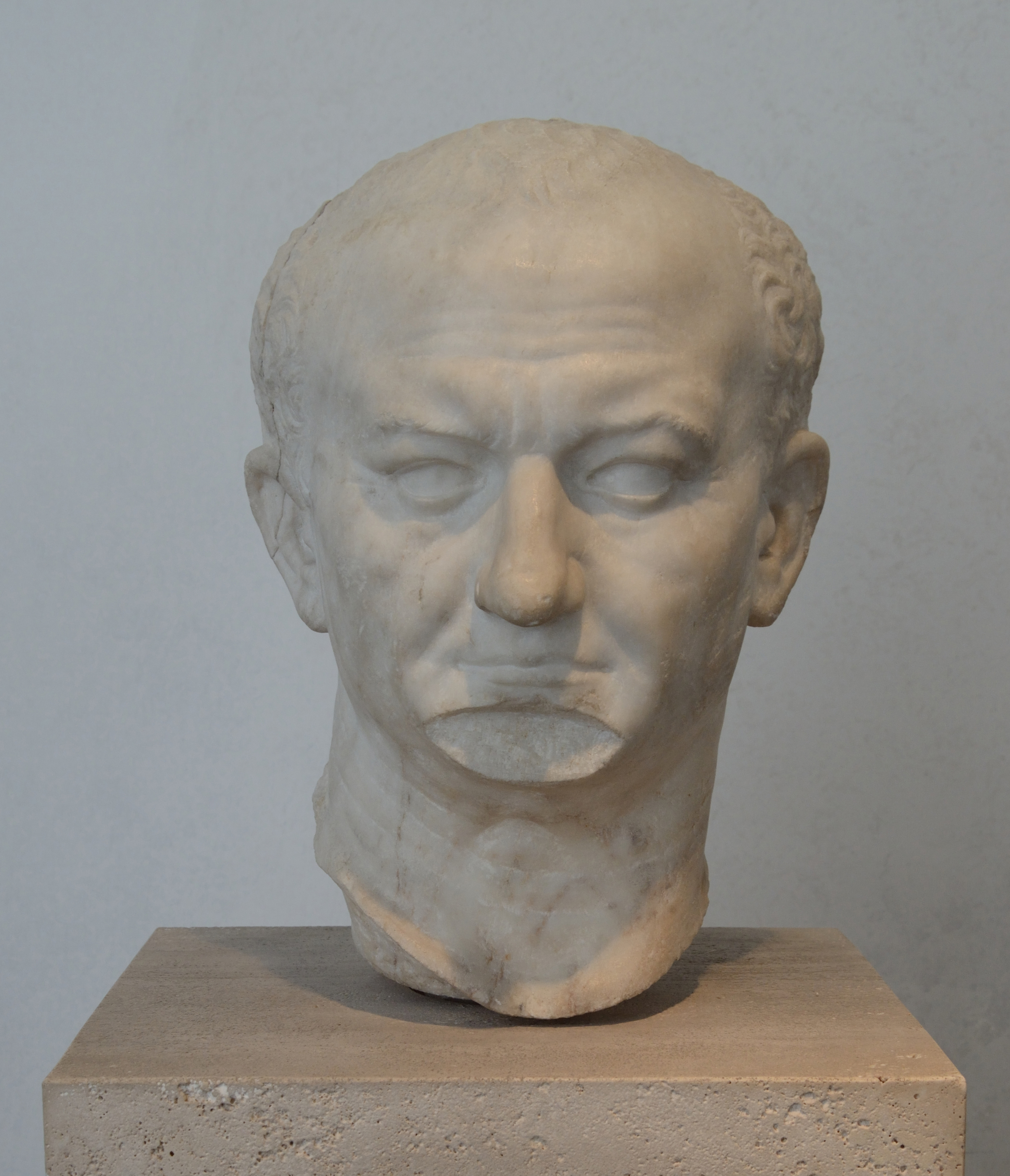
Head of Vespasian from Ostia

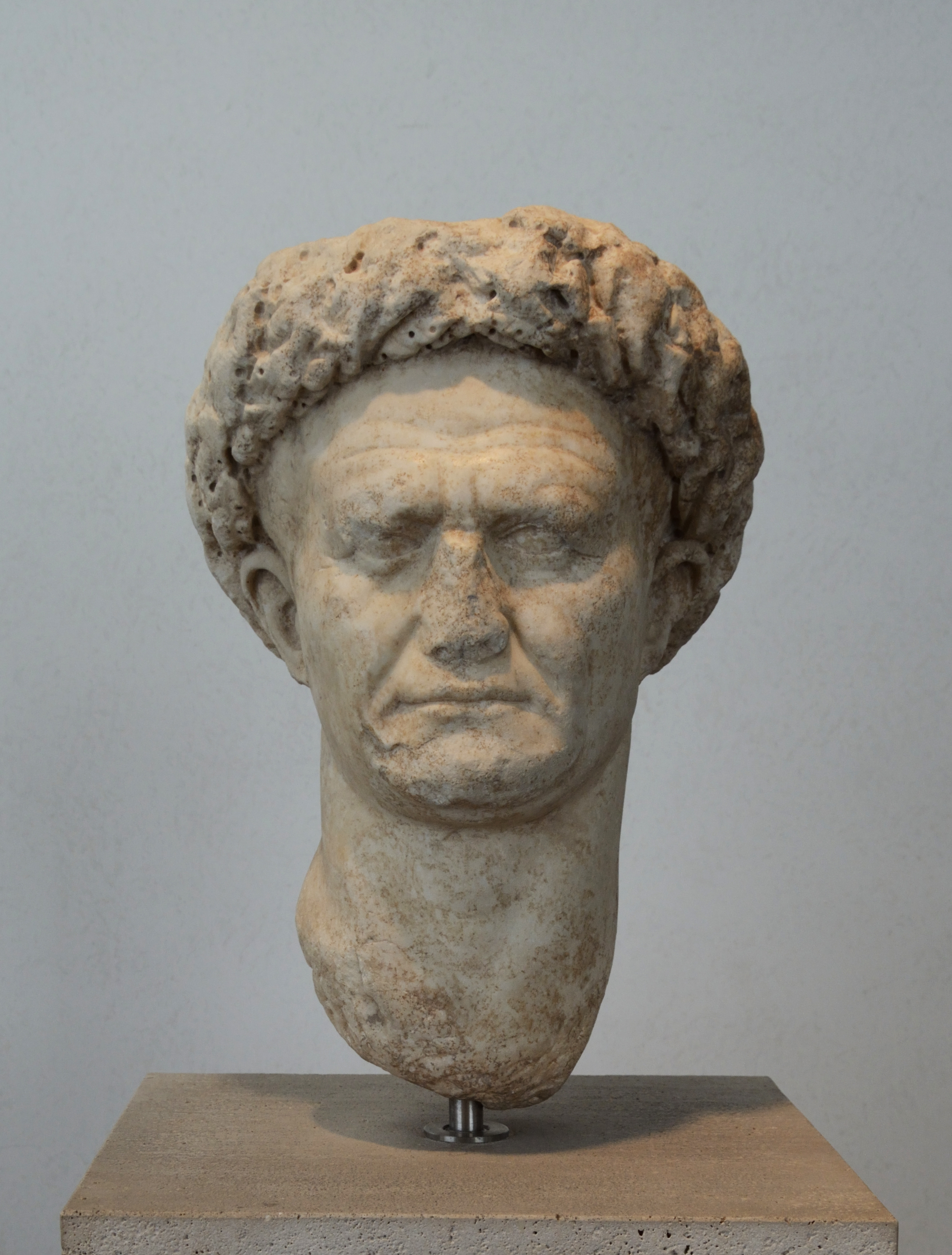
Head of Vespasian with civic crown from Minturnae

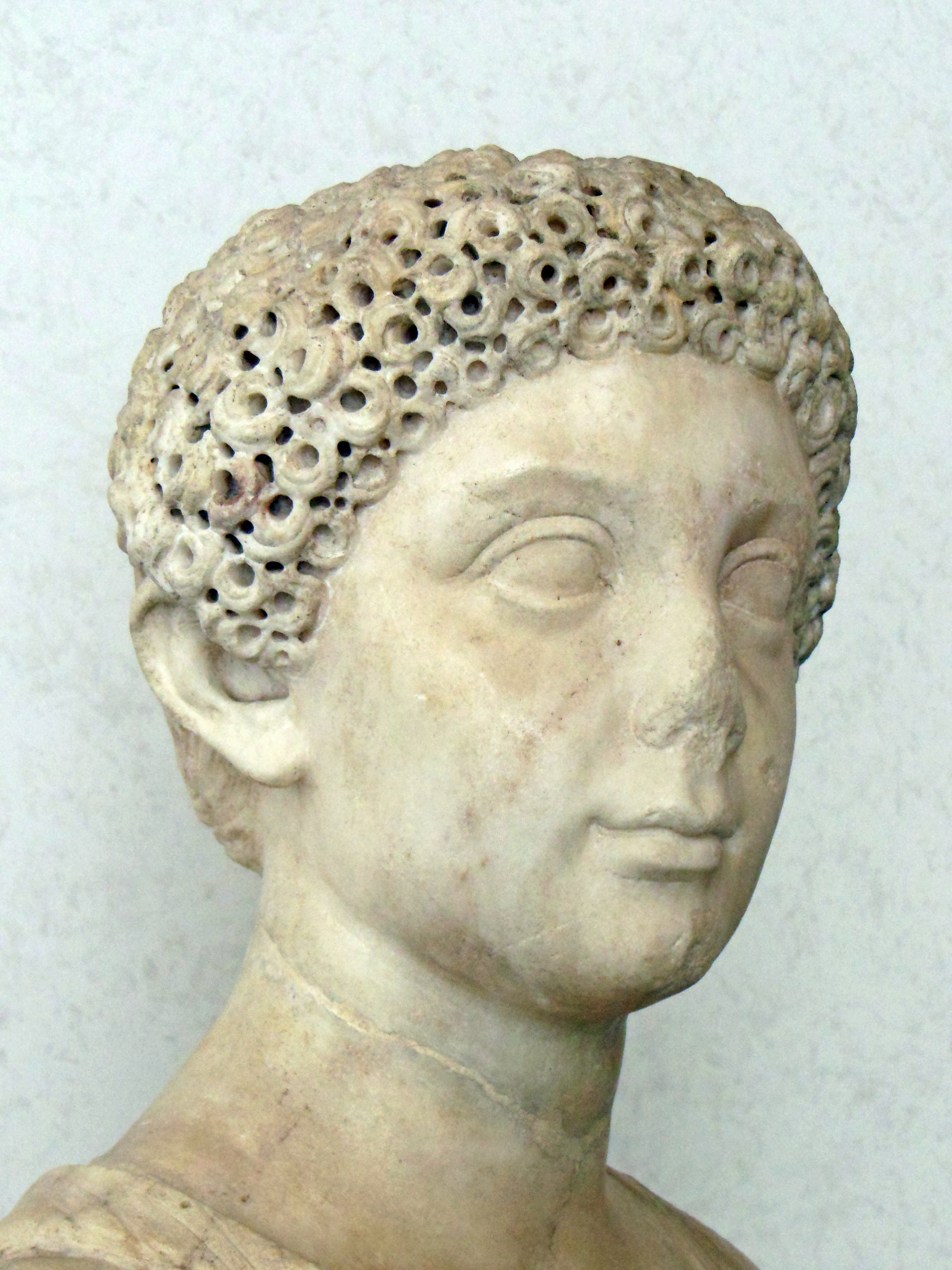
Bust of Julia, daughter of Titus (found on Tiber Island, at Fatebenefratelli Hospital; inv. 121.215)

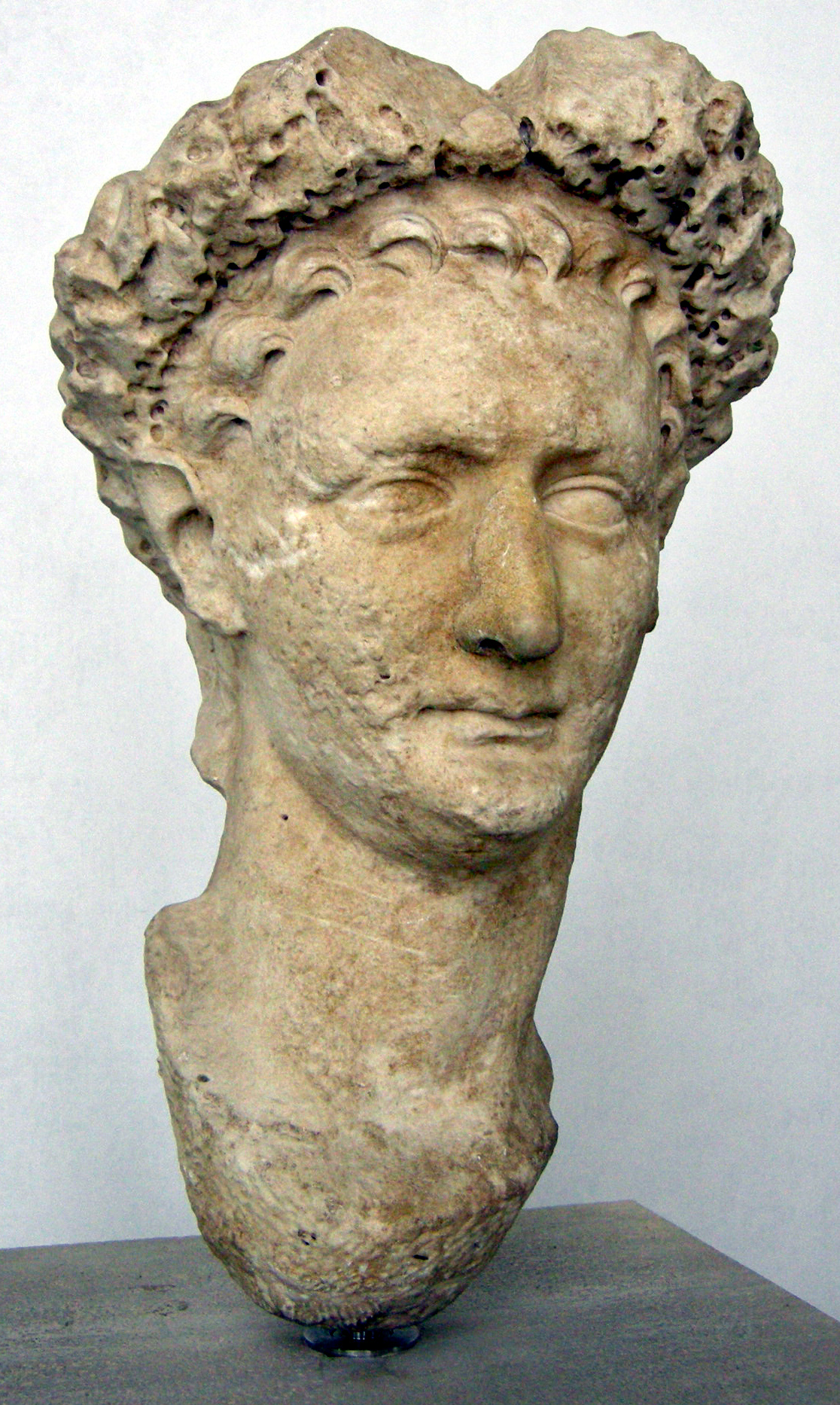
Bust of Domitian in pro-Hellenic style, found in Latina (inv. 115.191)

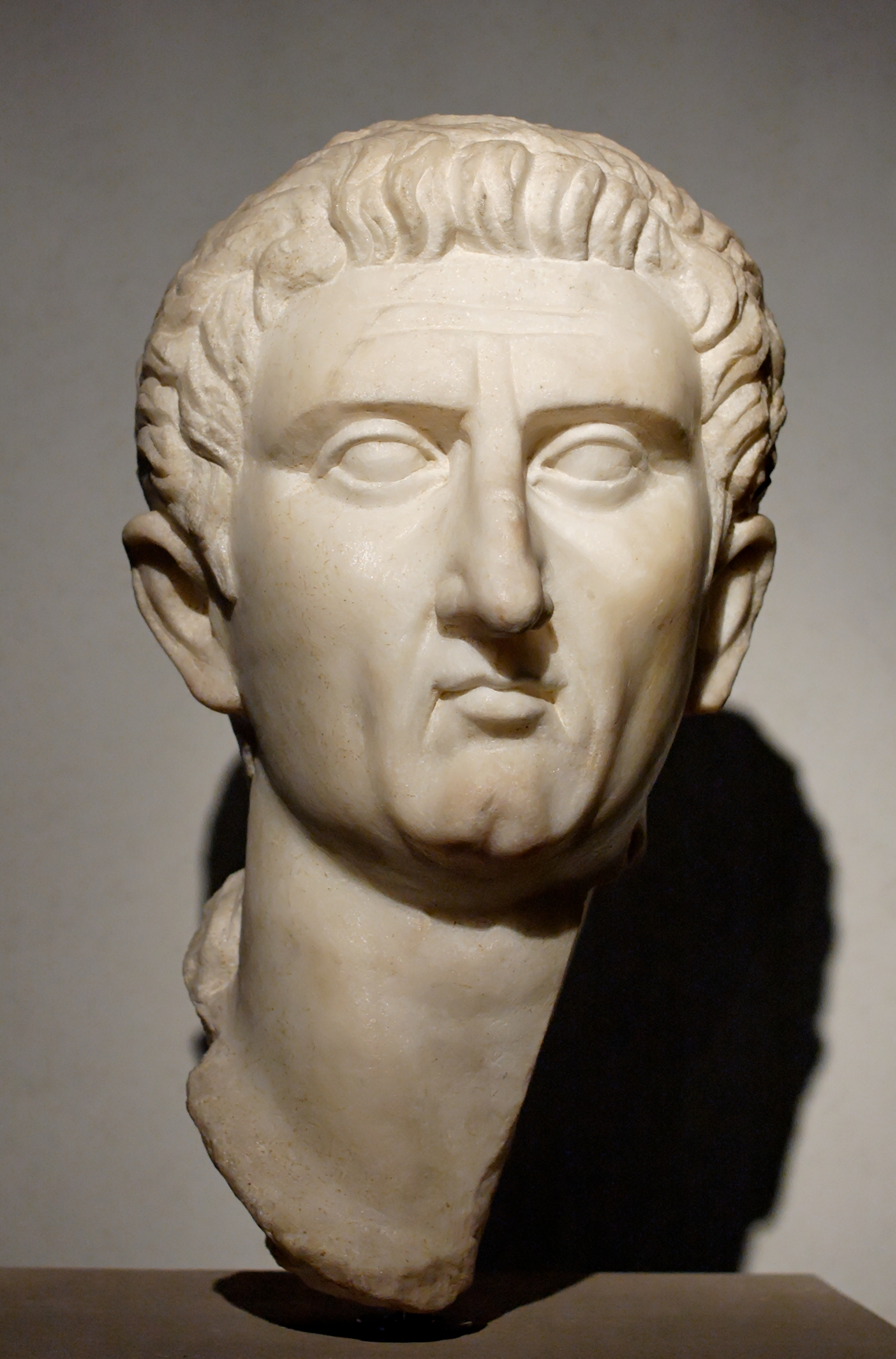
Bust of Emperor Nerva from Tivoli (inf. 106,538)

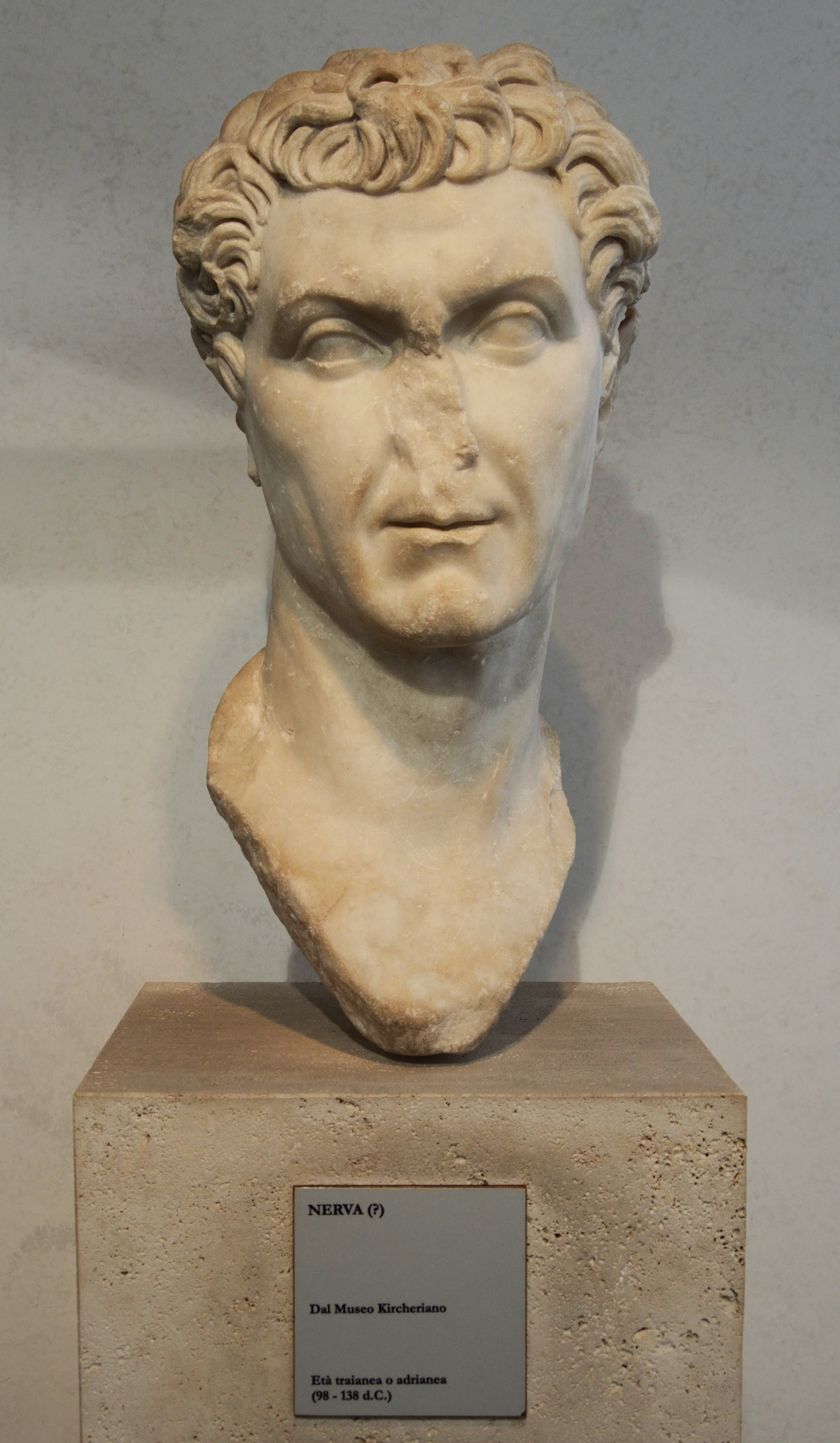
Bust of Nerva (?) from Tivoli

=== Room II (first floor) ===
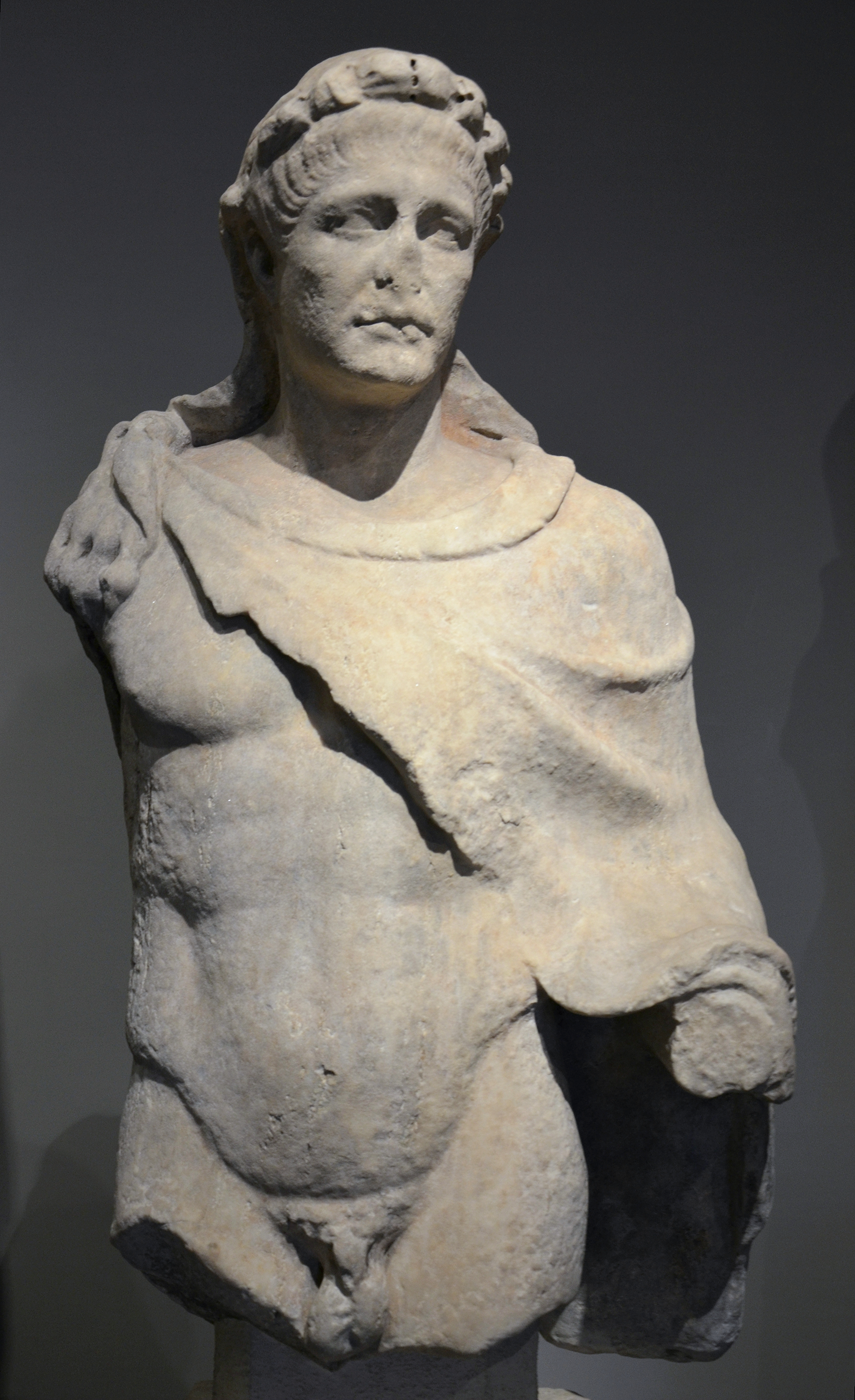
Trajan depicted as Hercules (statue dated between 108 and 113; inv. 124.481)

One then enters "Room II," passing among loricate statues, where one finds representations of the two principes Trajan (98-117) and Hadrian (117-138). Of the first emperor there is a portrait in which he is depicted as Hercules and wearing a lion's skin (and probably also carrying a club). The crown of pine branches, however, represents another deity, Silvanus, linked to the world of forests (perhaps of Dacia).

Next are a series of portraits dedicated to Plotina, wife of Trajan, Hadrian (with the characteristic short curls and beard), of his wife Vibia Aurelia Sabina, as well as the latter emperor's favorite, Antinous, depicted perhaps as a priest of the Magna Mater.

Also in this room is a relief from Lanuvio that again depicts Antinous in the guise of Silvanus, cutting some bunches of grapes with a sickle.

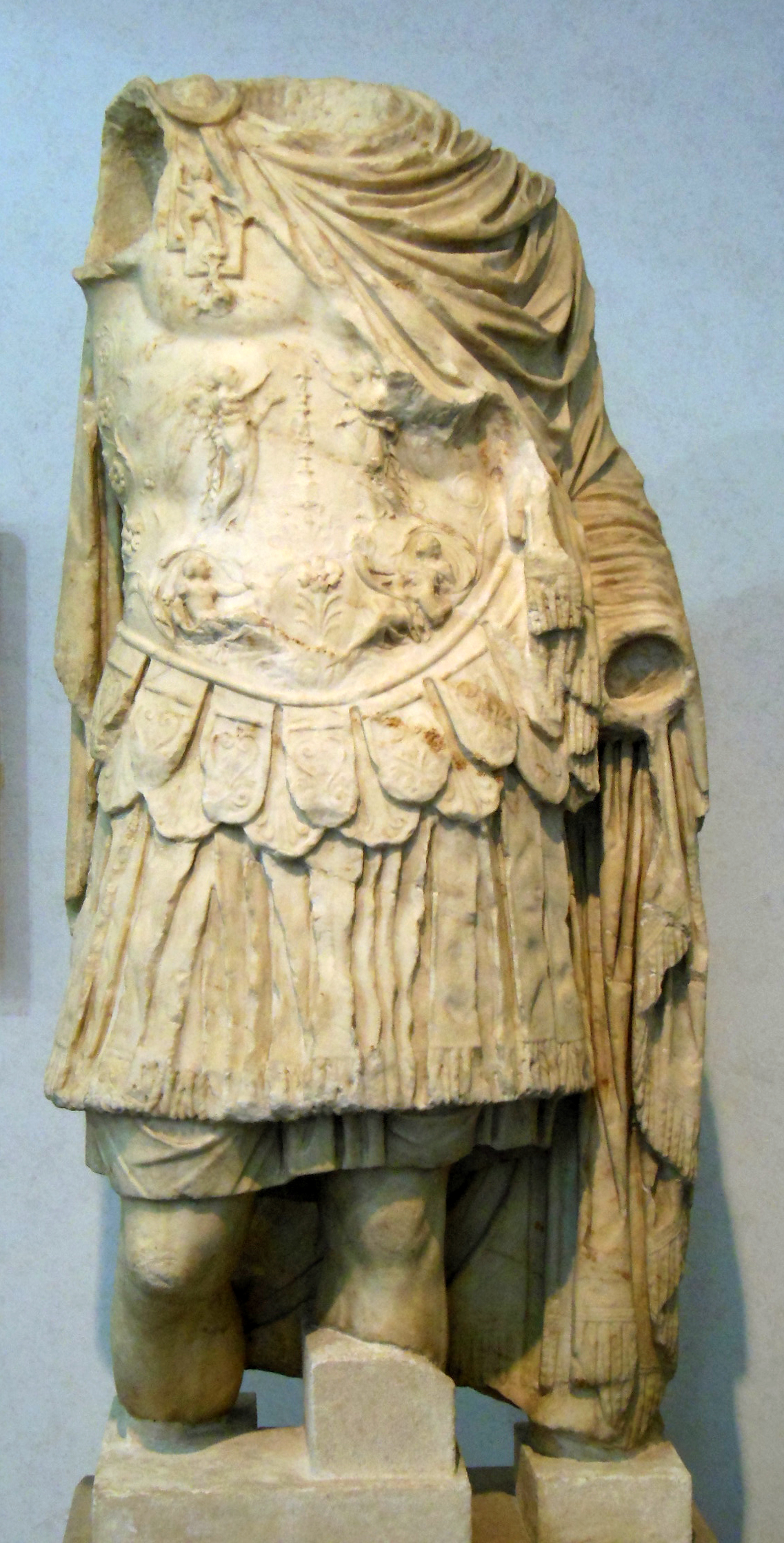
Loricate statue between "room I" and "room II"

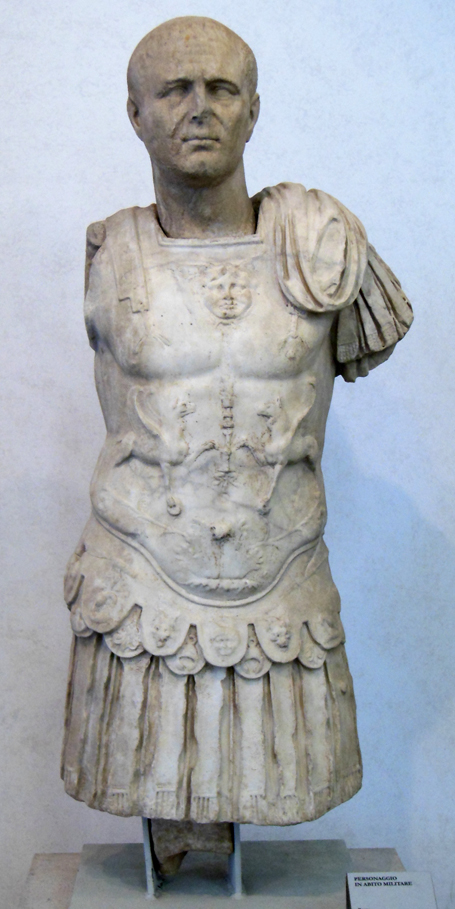
Second loricate statue from the Trajan era

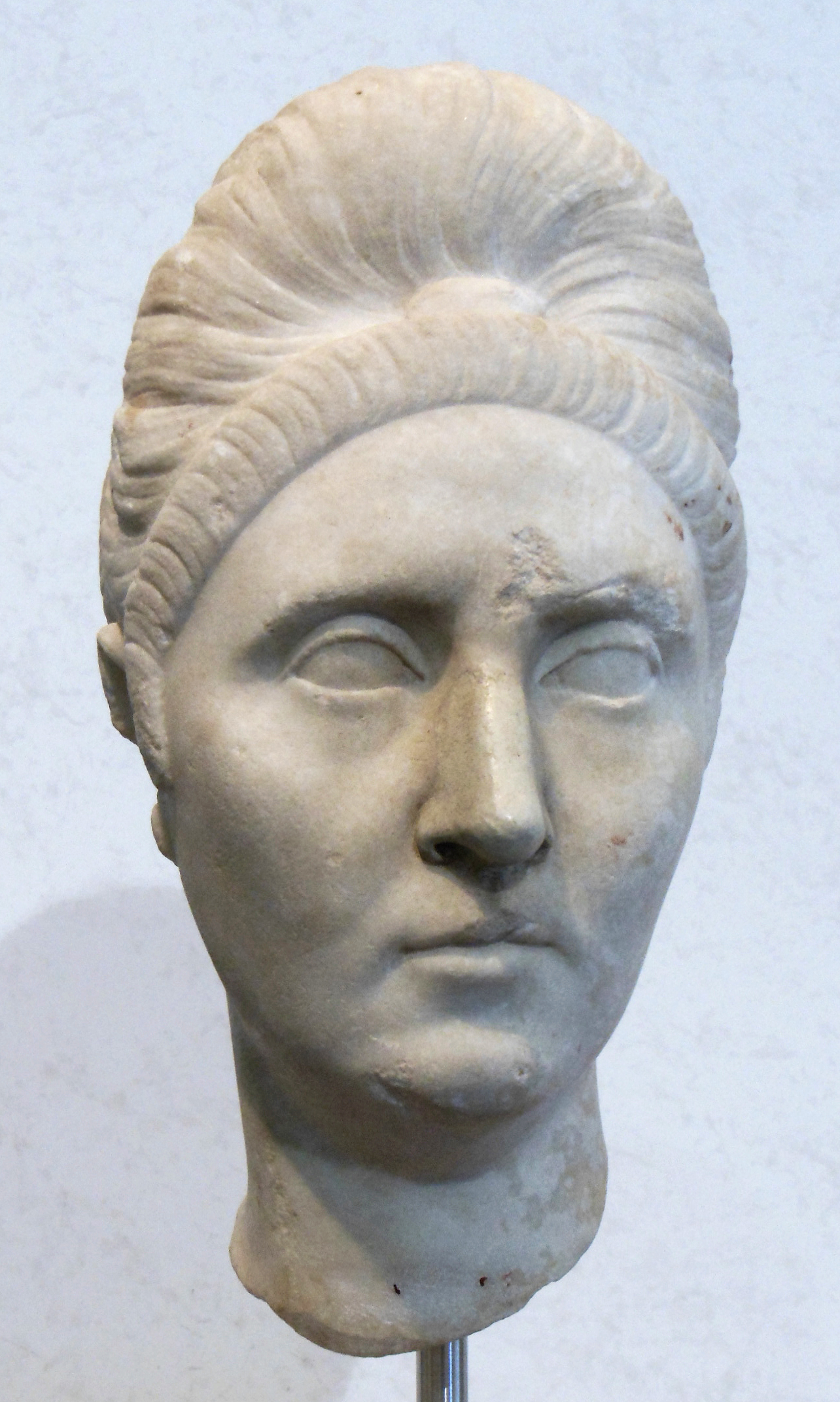
Portrait of Plotina, wife of Trajan

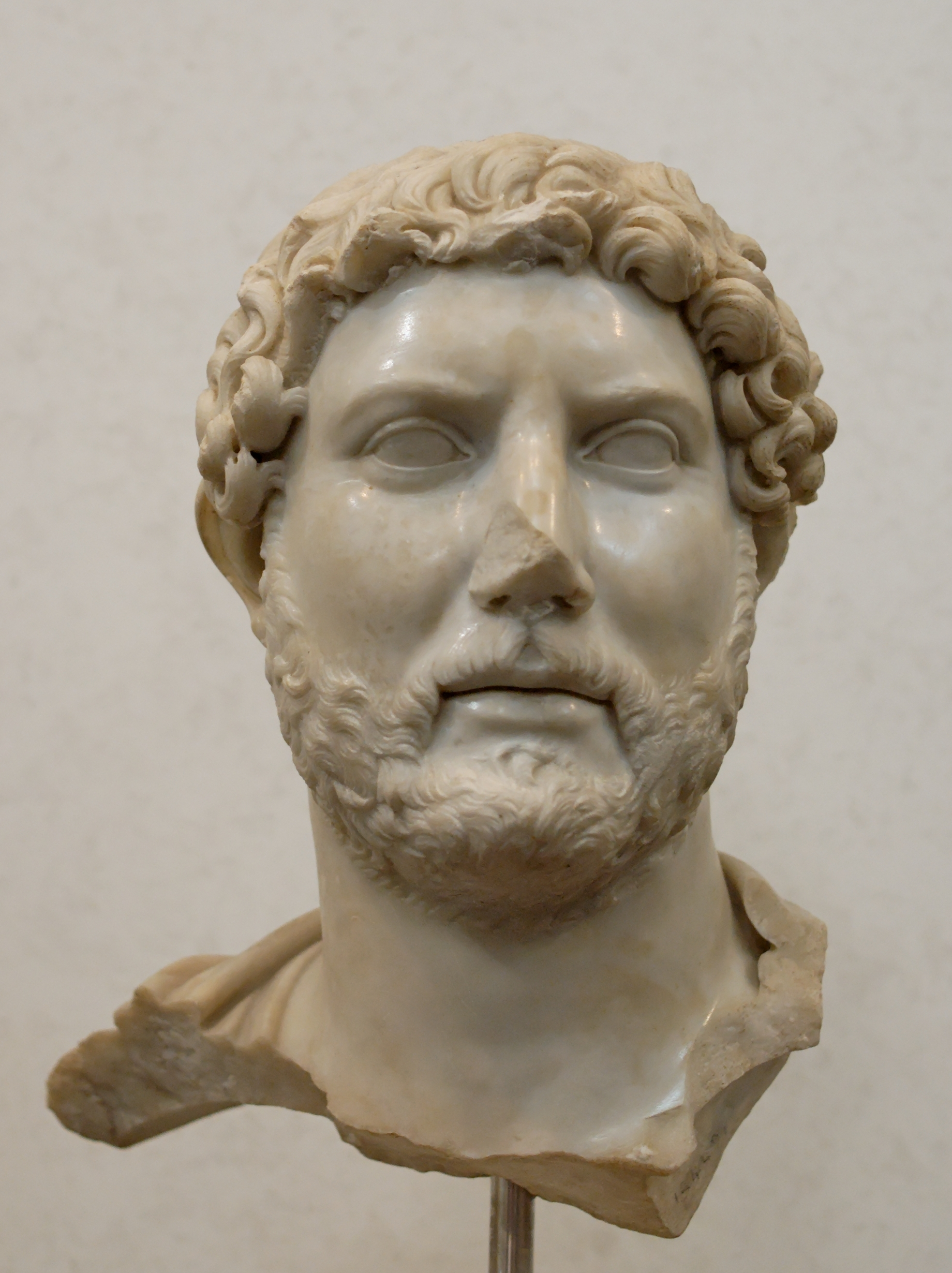
Portrait of Hadrian (found at the arch of Santa Bibiana in Rome, in the Horti Liciniani; inv. 124.491)

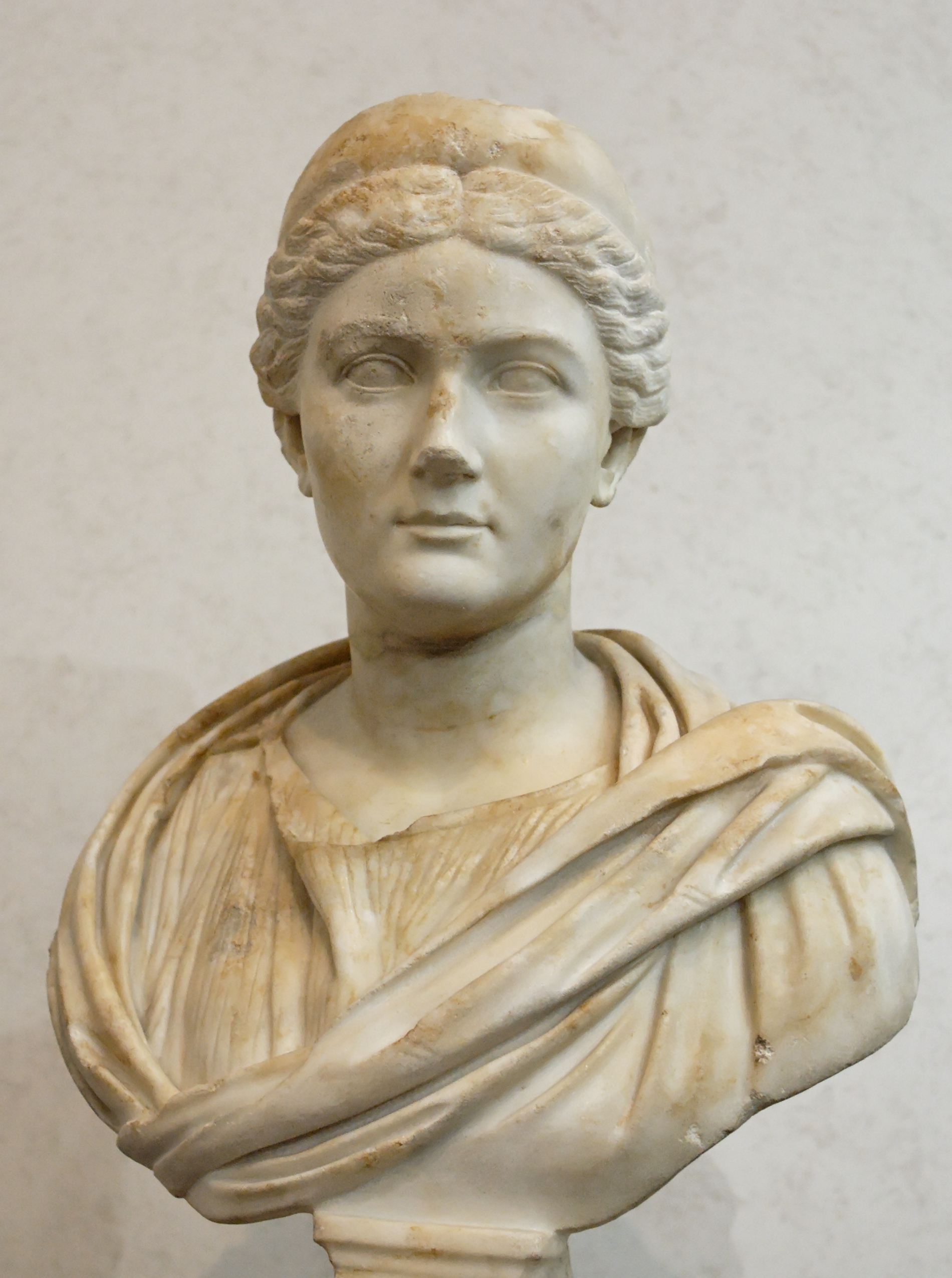
Portrait of Vibia Sabina from the Appian Way.

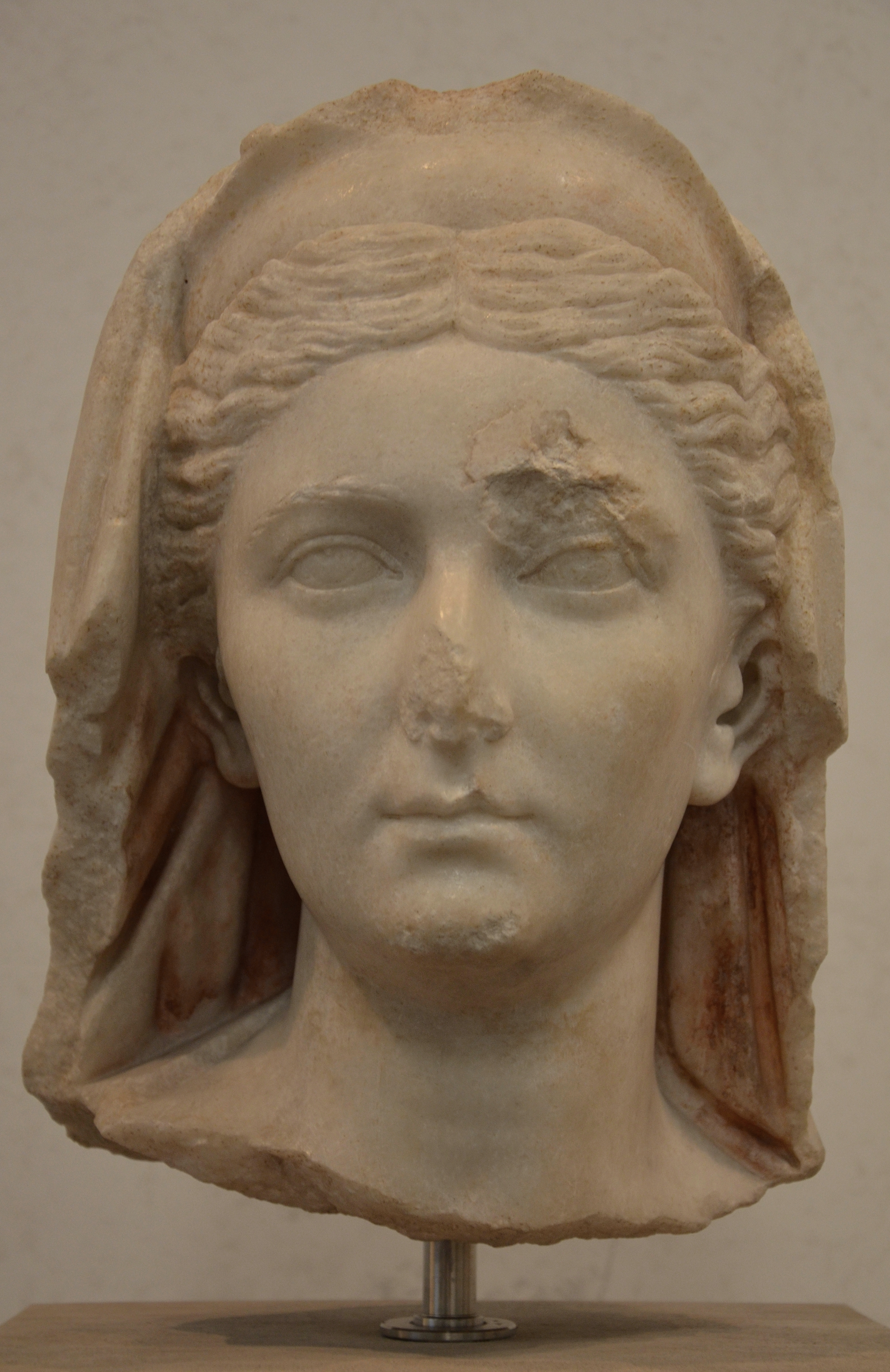
Vibia Sabina from the Vittoriano area (inv. 629).

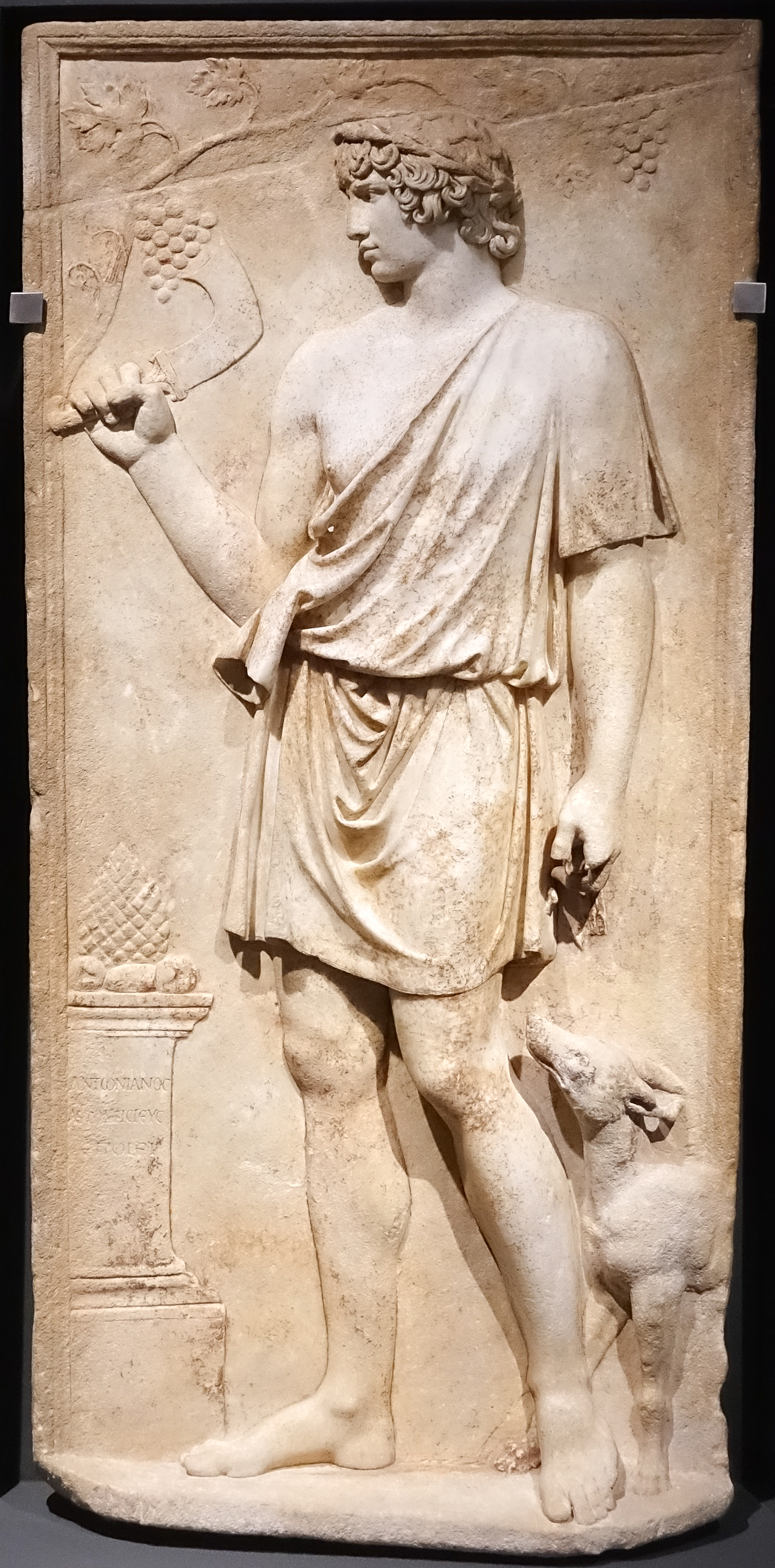
Antinous, represented as Silvanus

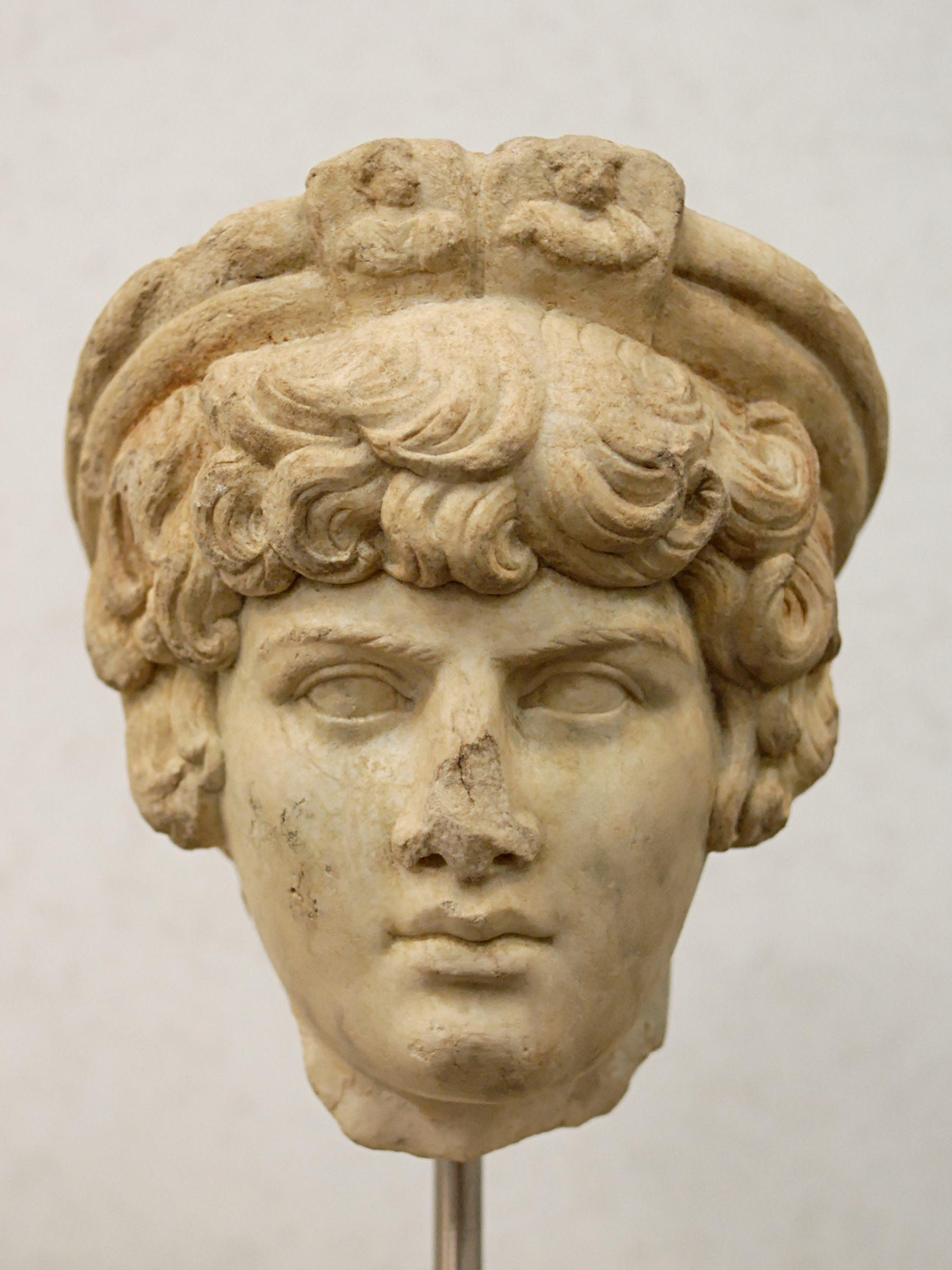
Portrait of Antinous from Ostia, depicted as a priest of the Magna Mater

=== Room III (first floor) ===
"Room III" was set up to show the image and celebration of the principate of Antoninus Pius, a period of peace in the empire (138-161). In this room are a pair of portraits of the emperor (one from Formia and one from Terracina), one of which shows the heroized imperial image. The emperor appears naked wearing a cloak fastened over his left shoulder, while his right arm originally rested on a spear. Female figures, on the other hand, were shown as models of devotion to their princeps, as in the case of the statue of Faustina the Younger, daughter of Antoninus Pius and wife of Marcus Aurelius.

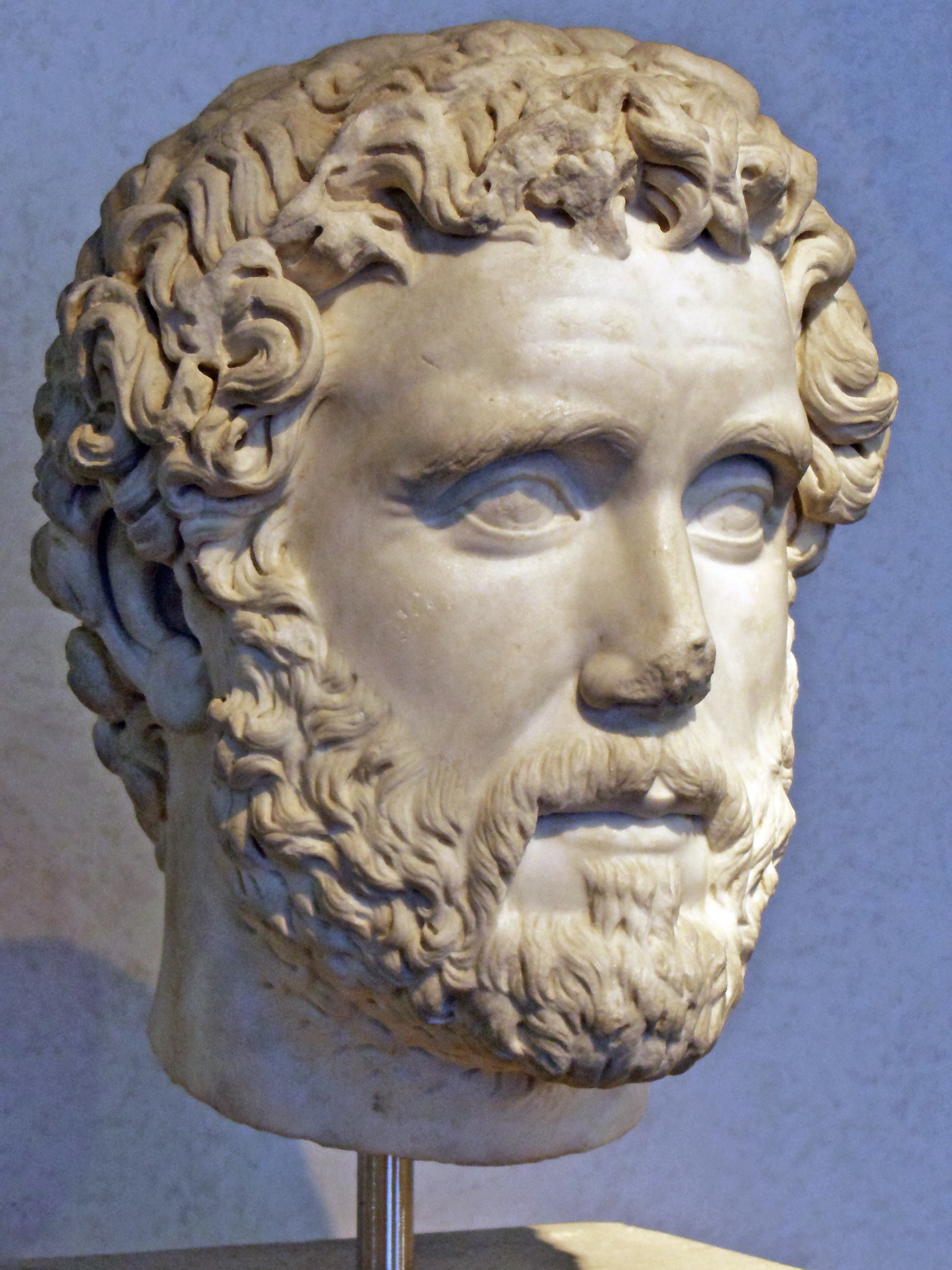
Portrait of Antoninus Pius

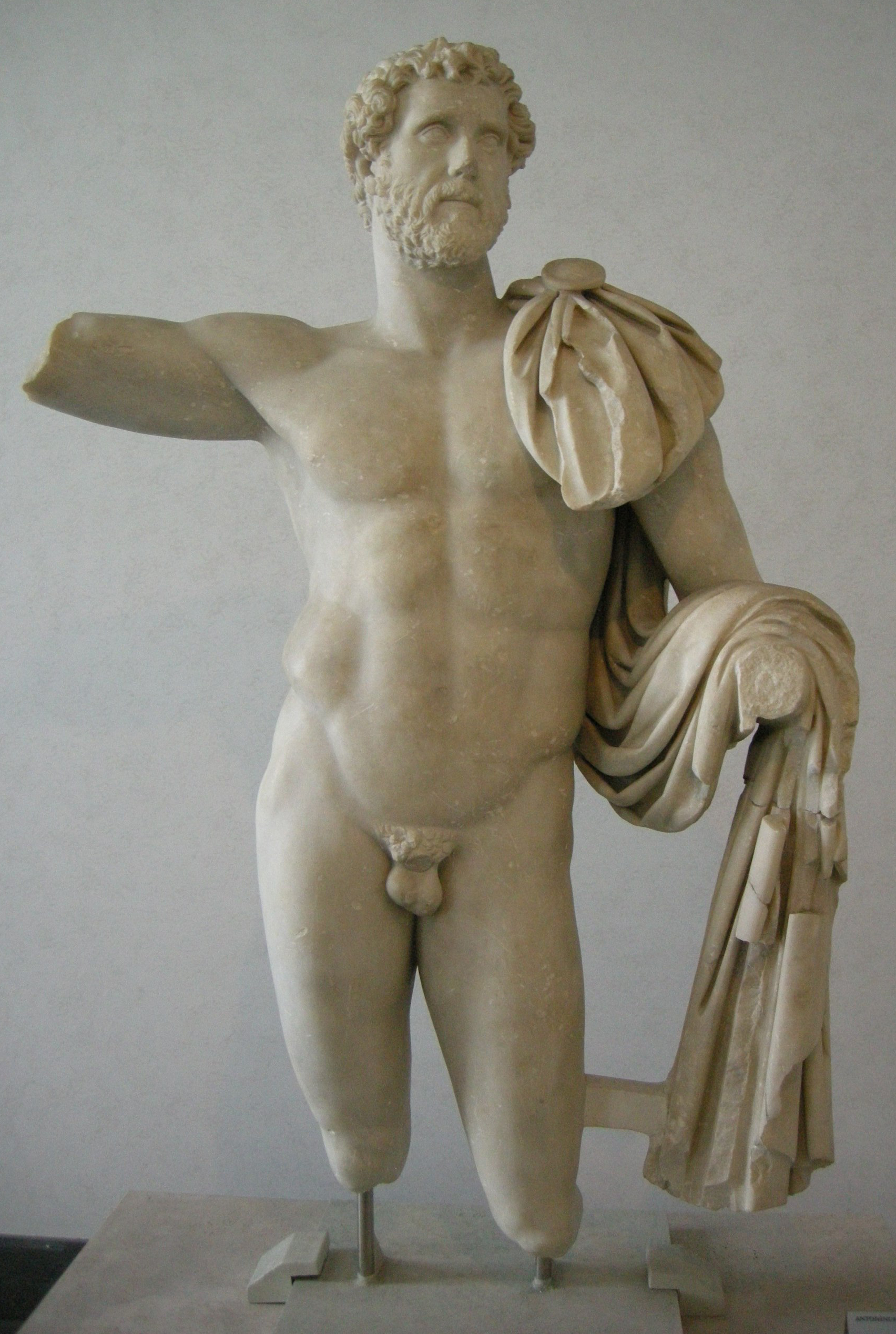
Heroized statue of Antoninus Pius (from Terracina; h. 174 cm; inv. 135.845)

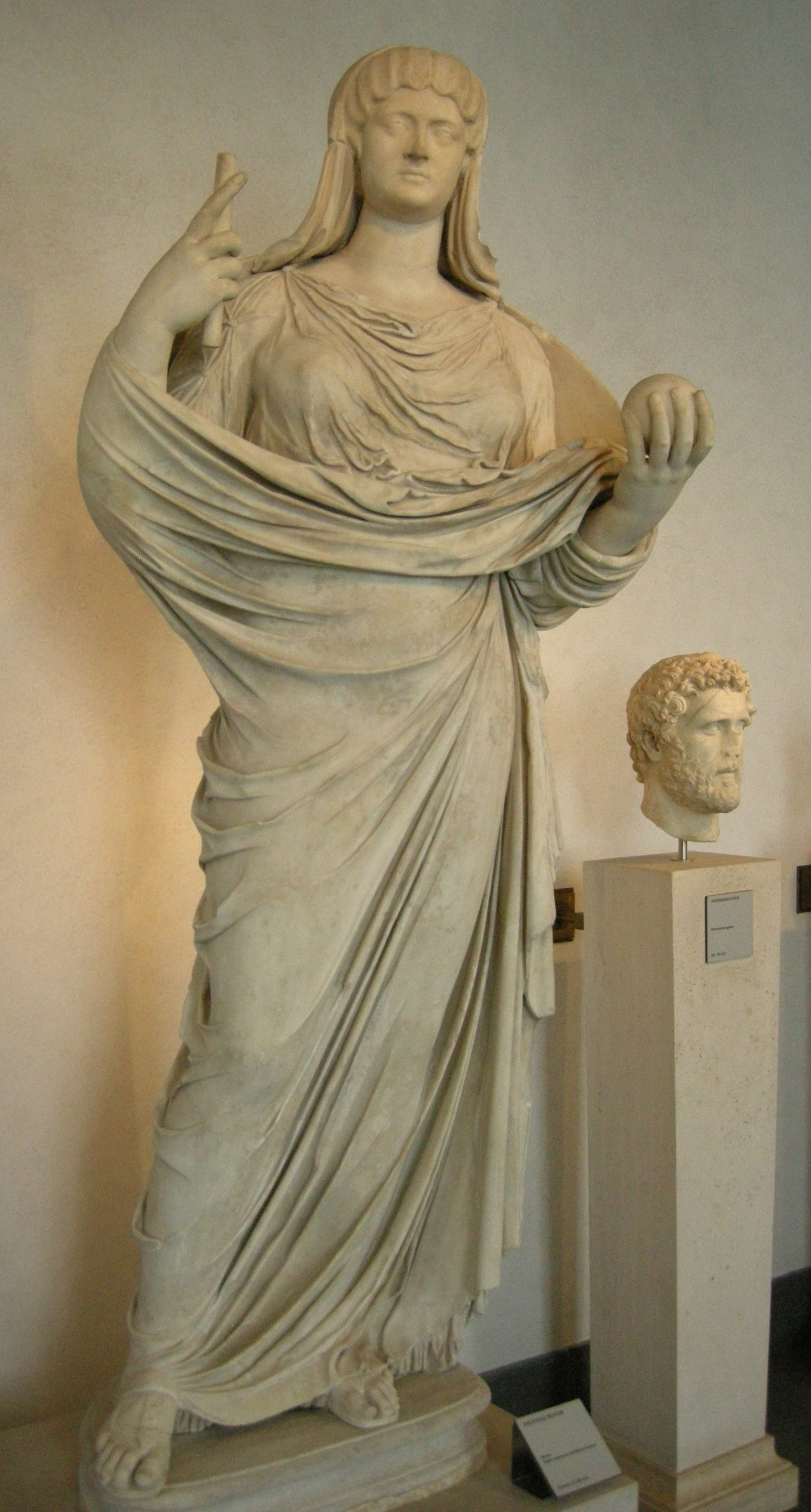
Statue of Faustina the Younger (from Sciarra Palace; h. 195 cm, with plinth 207 cm; inv. 68)

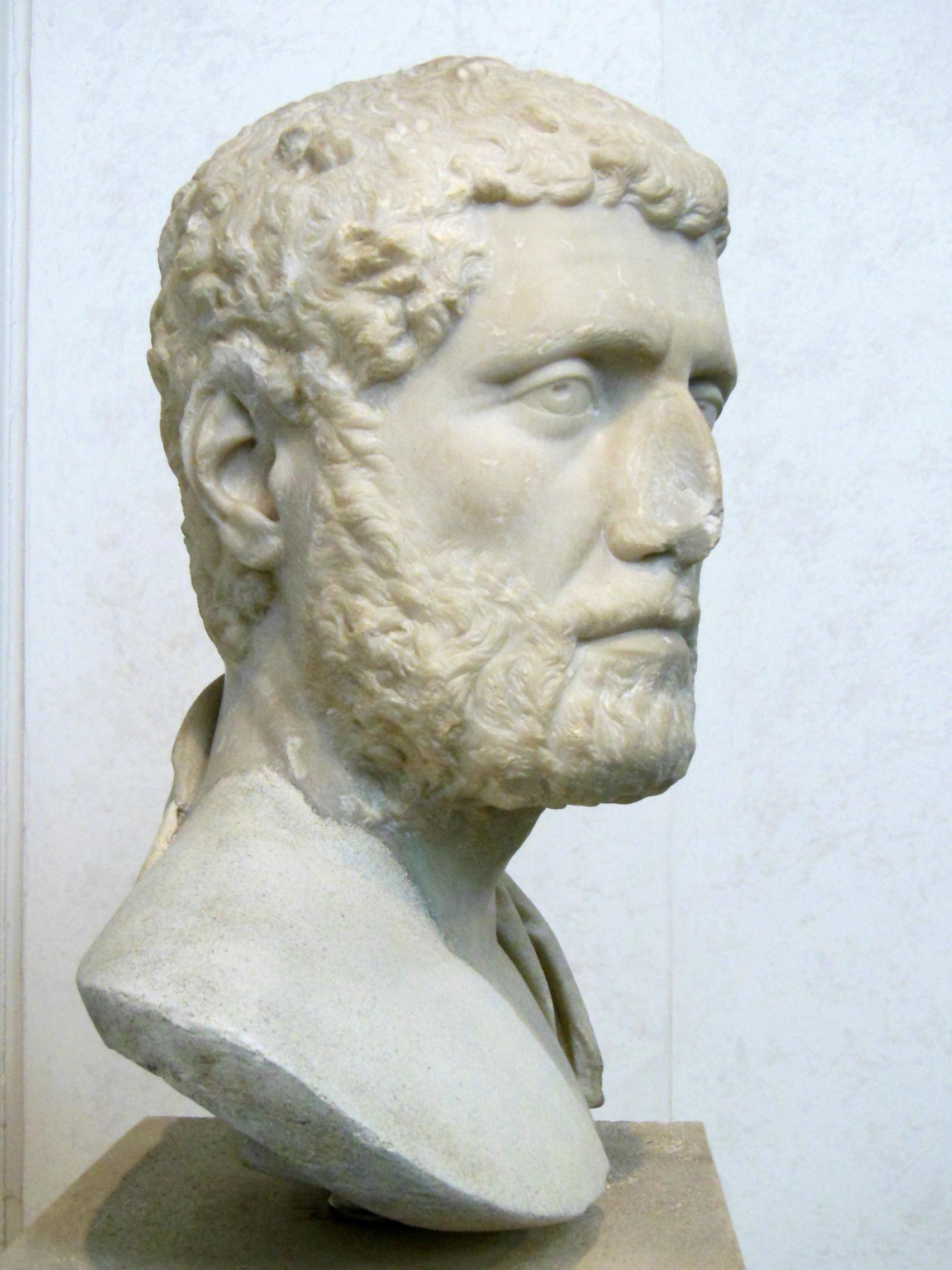
Portrait of a philosopher of the Hadrianic or Antonine age (Tiber)

Also in this room are two panels belonging to the decoration of the Hadrianeum (Temple of Hadrian) dedicated by Antoninus Pius in 145. The two panels each depict the female personification of a Roman province: an amazon, holding a curved sword, may represent Thracia; the one, on the other hand, wearing a rosette diadem possibly depicts Egypt. They came from the collection of the Odescalchi Palace, following their discovery during excavations under Pope Alexander VII (1655-1667).

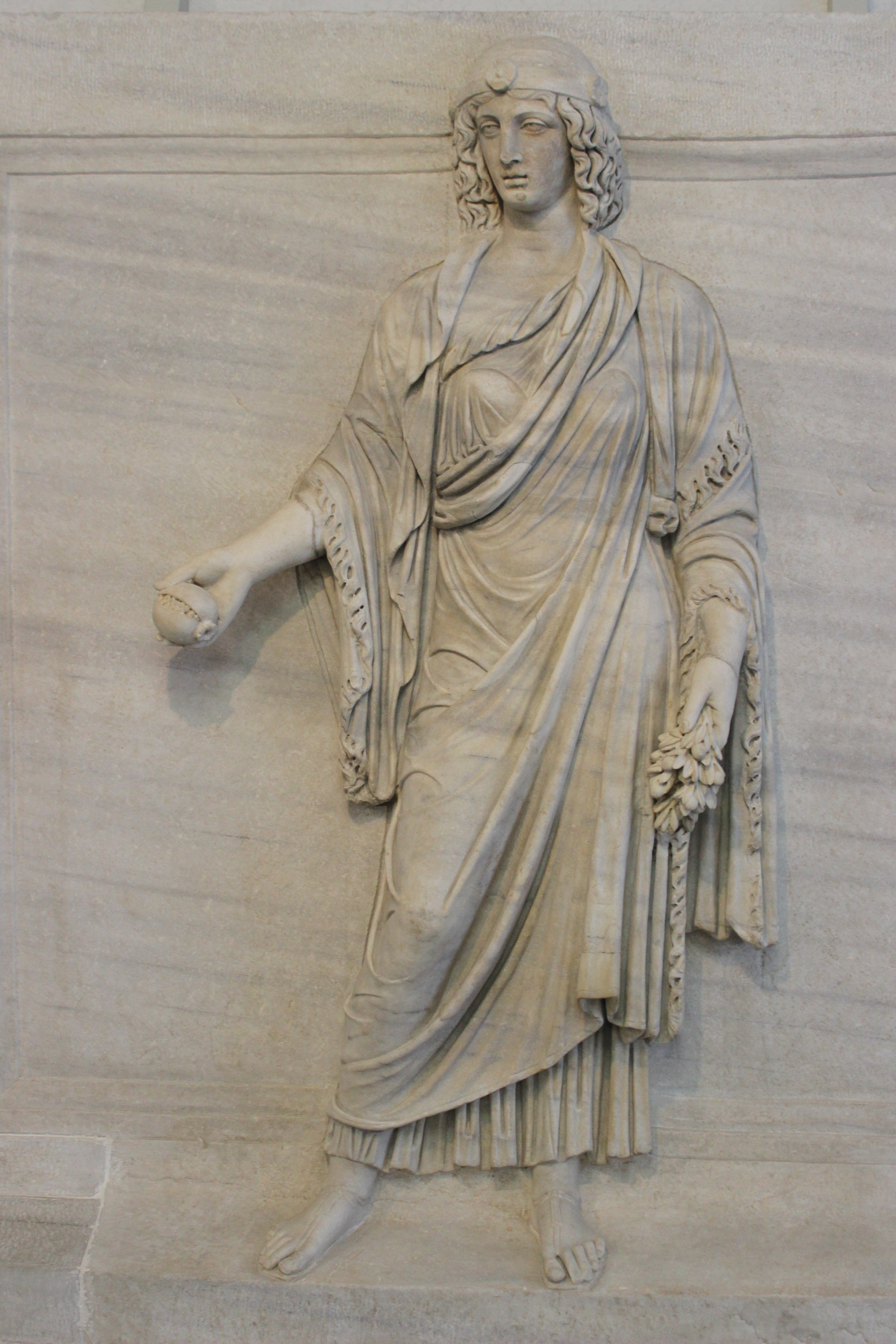
Relief of the Roman province of Egypt (Rome, Temple of Hadrian; h. 164 cm x 144 cm w.; inv. 428.497)

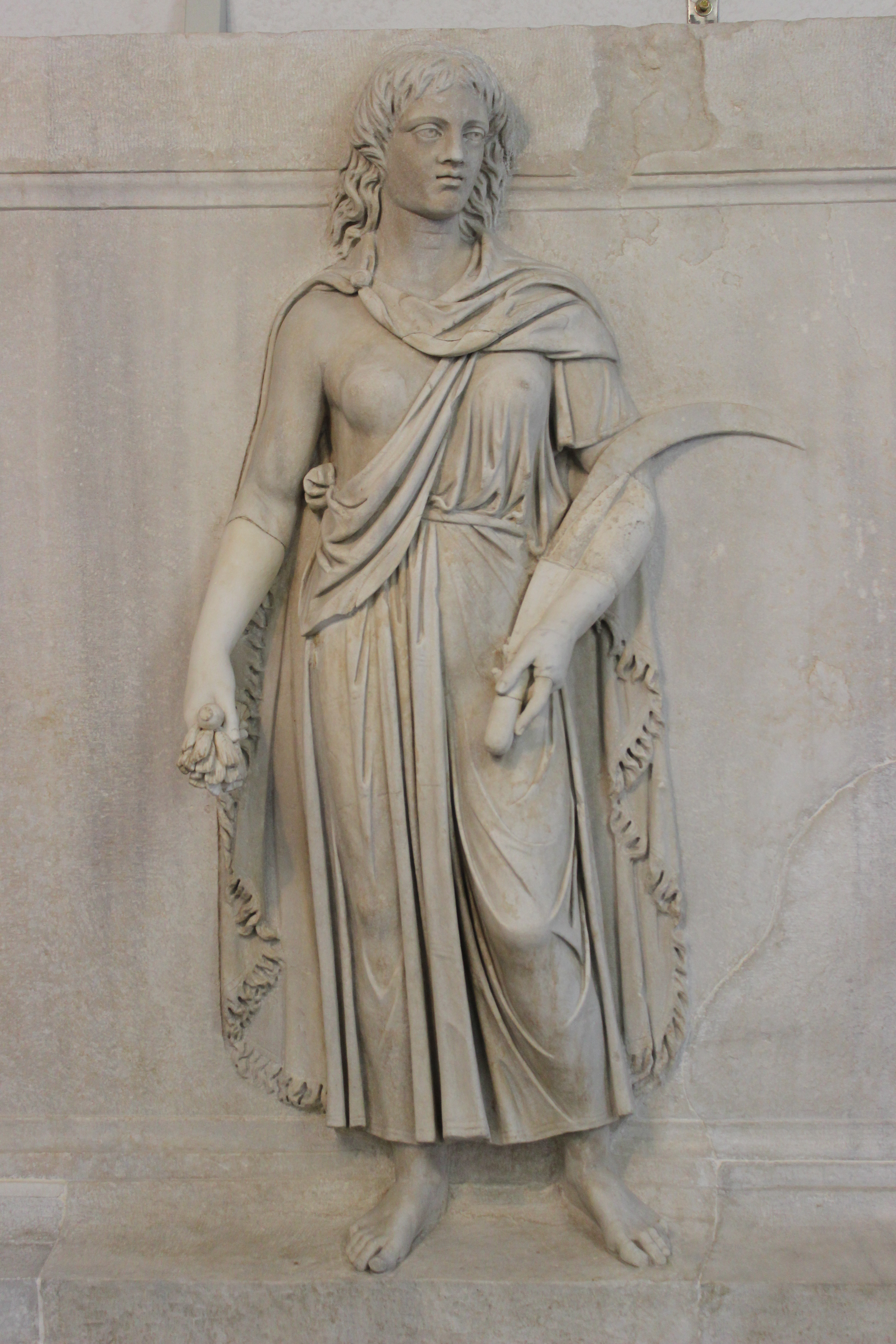
Relief of the Roman province of Thracia (Rome, Temple of Hadrian; h. 164 cm x 144 cm w.; inv. 428.496)

=== Room IV (first floor) ===
"Room IV" contains busts and statues from the reigns of Marcus Aurelius (161-180), his adopted brother Lucius Verus (161-169) and his son Commodus (180-192). There are also a statue of Annia Aurelia Galeria Lucilla, daughter of Marcus Aurelius, and a series of portraits of the three emperors, as well as two private portraits of bearded philosophers. The portraiture of the period features a hairstyle with voluminous curls and a long beard. The portrait of Crispina, wife of Commodus, also shows changes in hairstyles in the late second century.

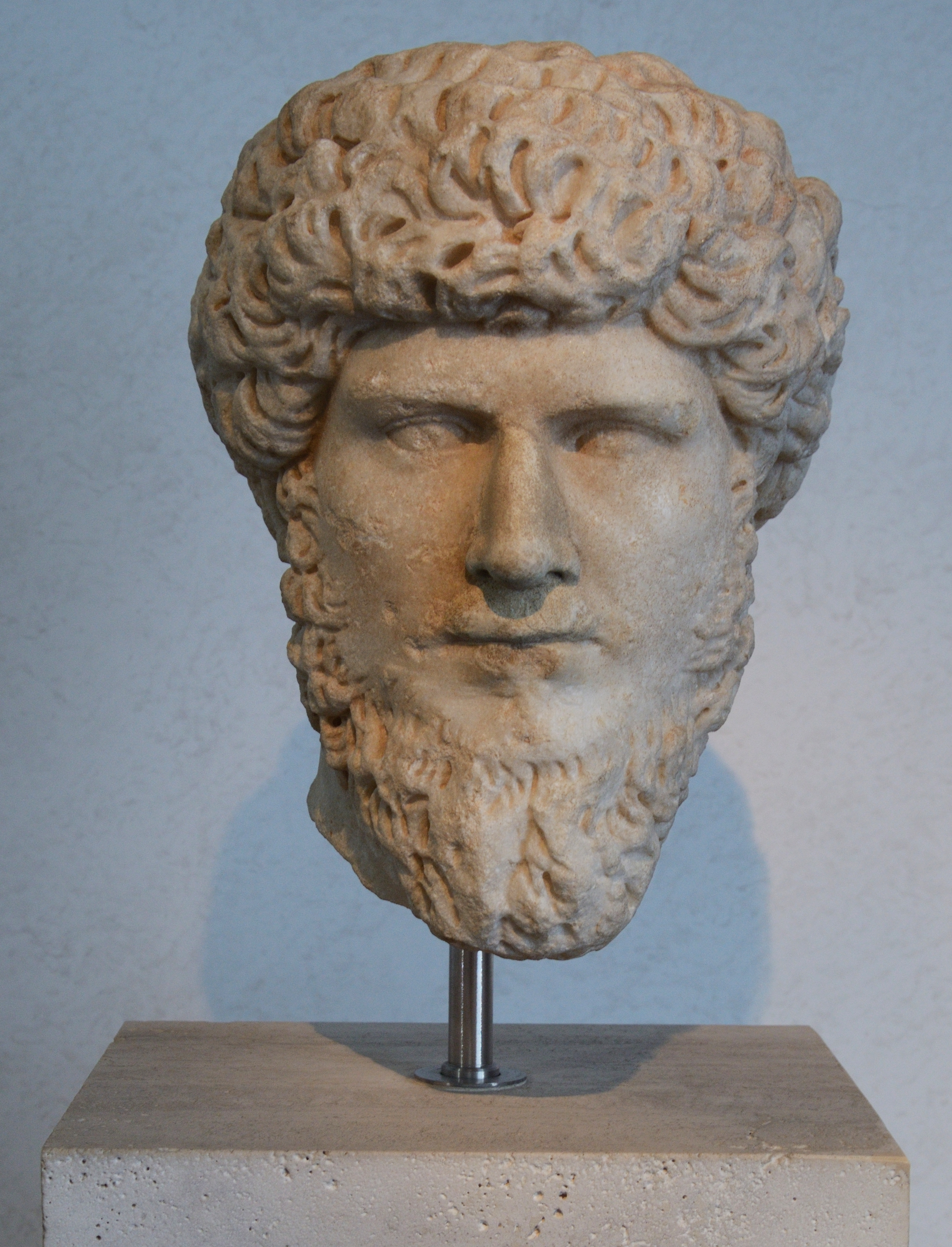
Head of Lucius Verus, who reigned from 161 to 169 together with his adopted brother Marcus

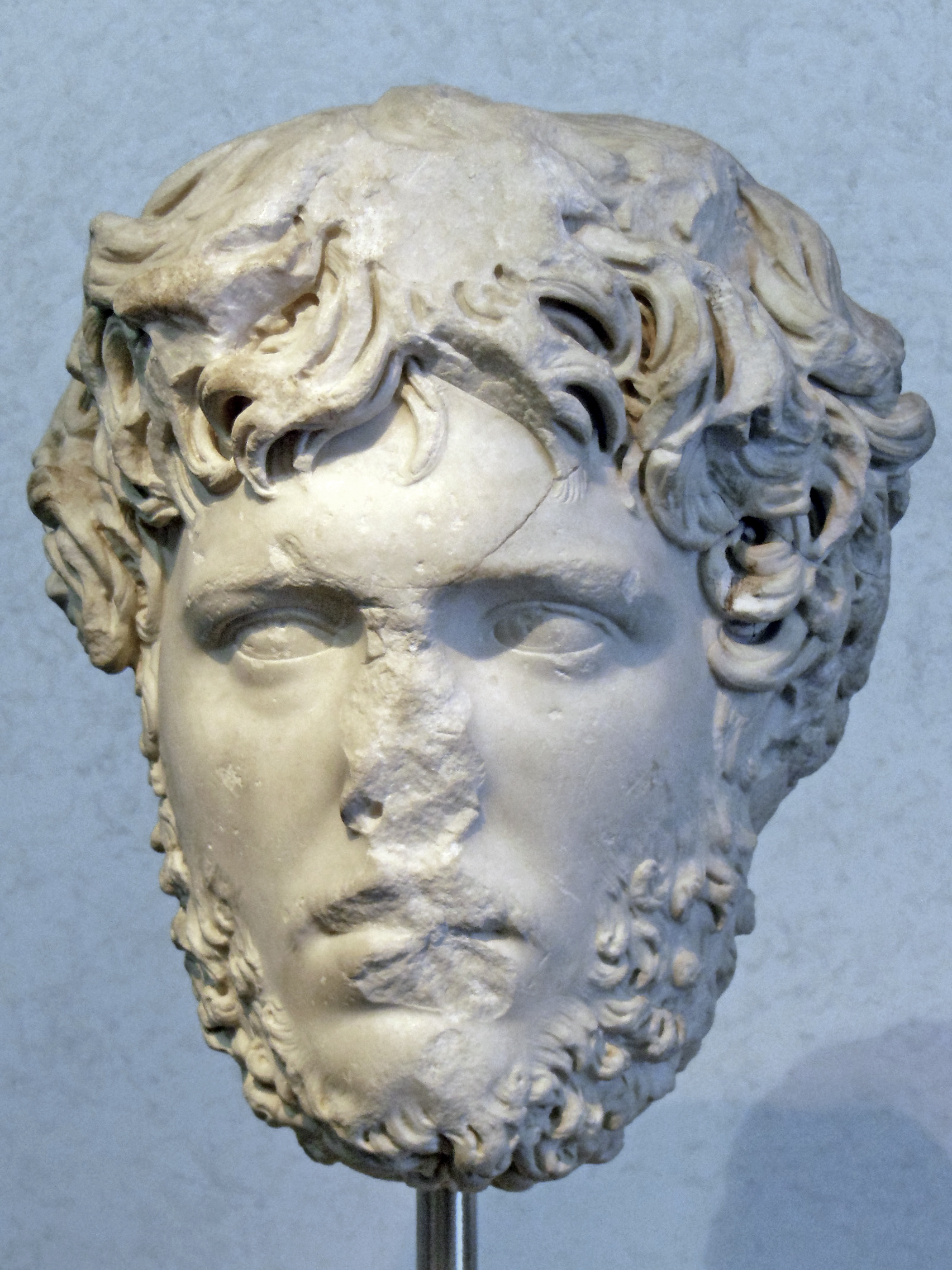
Portrait of a young Lucius Verus

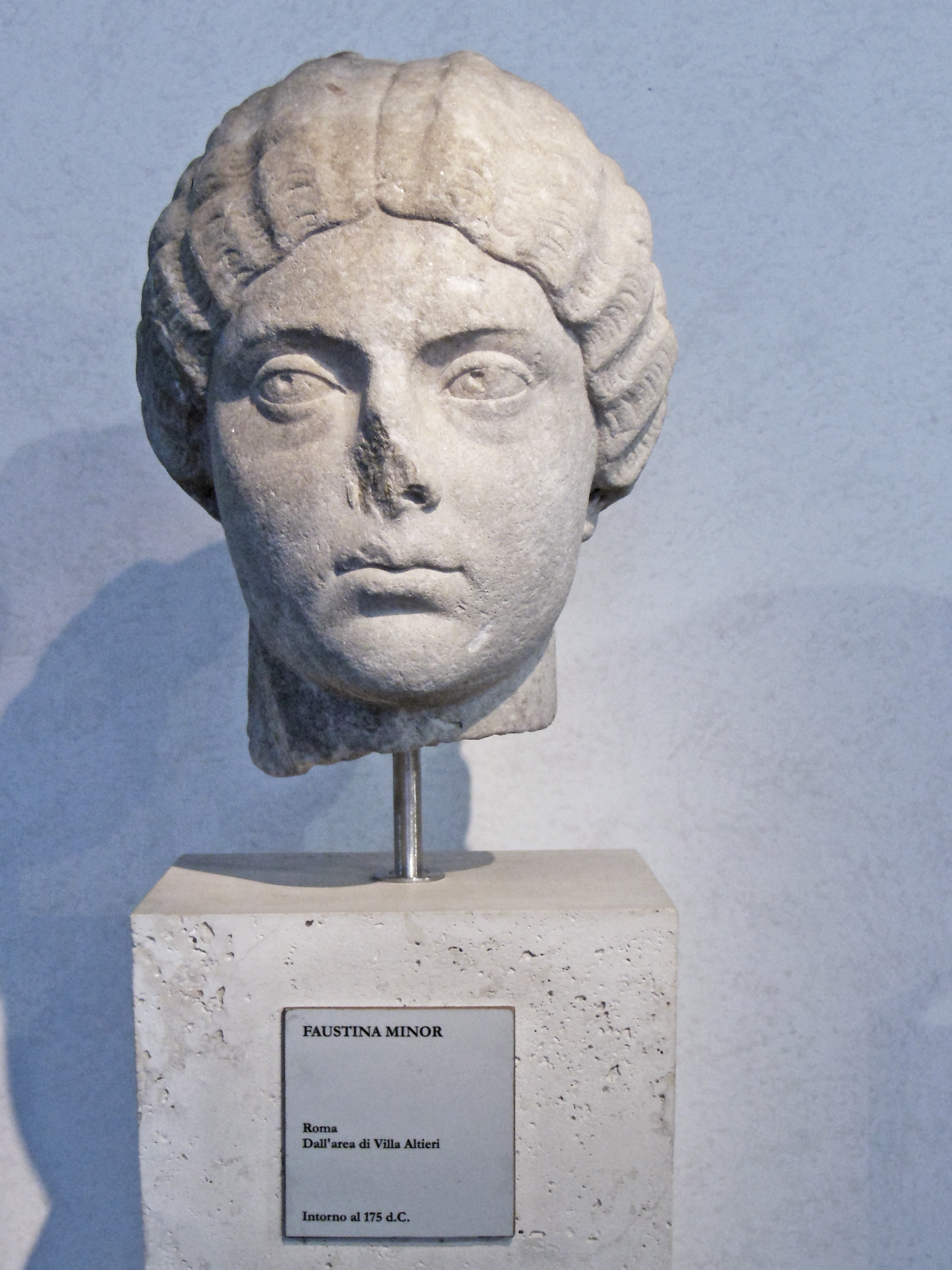
Head of Faustina the Younger, wife of Marcus Aurelius and mother of Commodus (Villa Altieri, Rome)

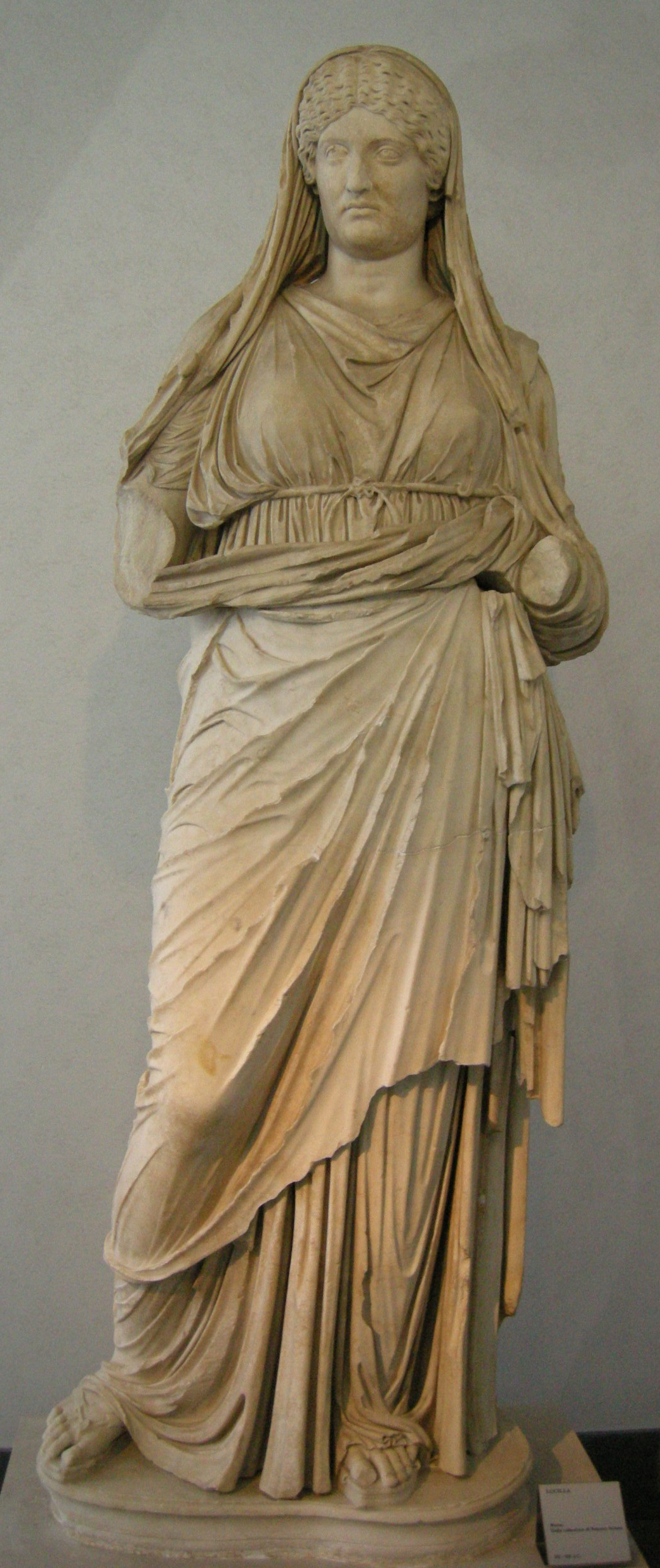
Statue of Annia Aurelia Galeria Lucilla, daughter of Marcus Aurelius

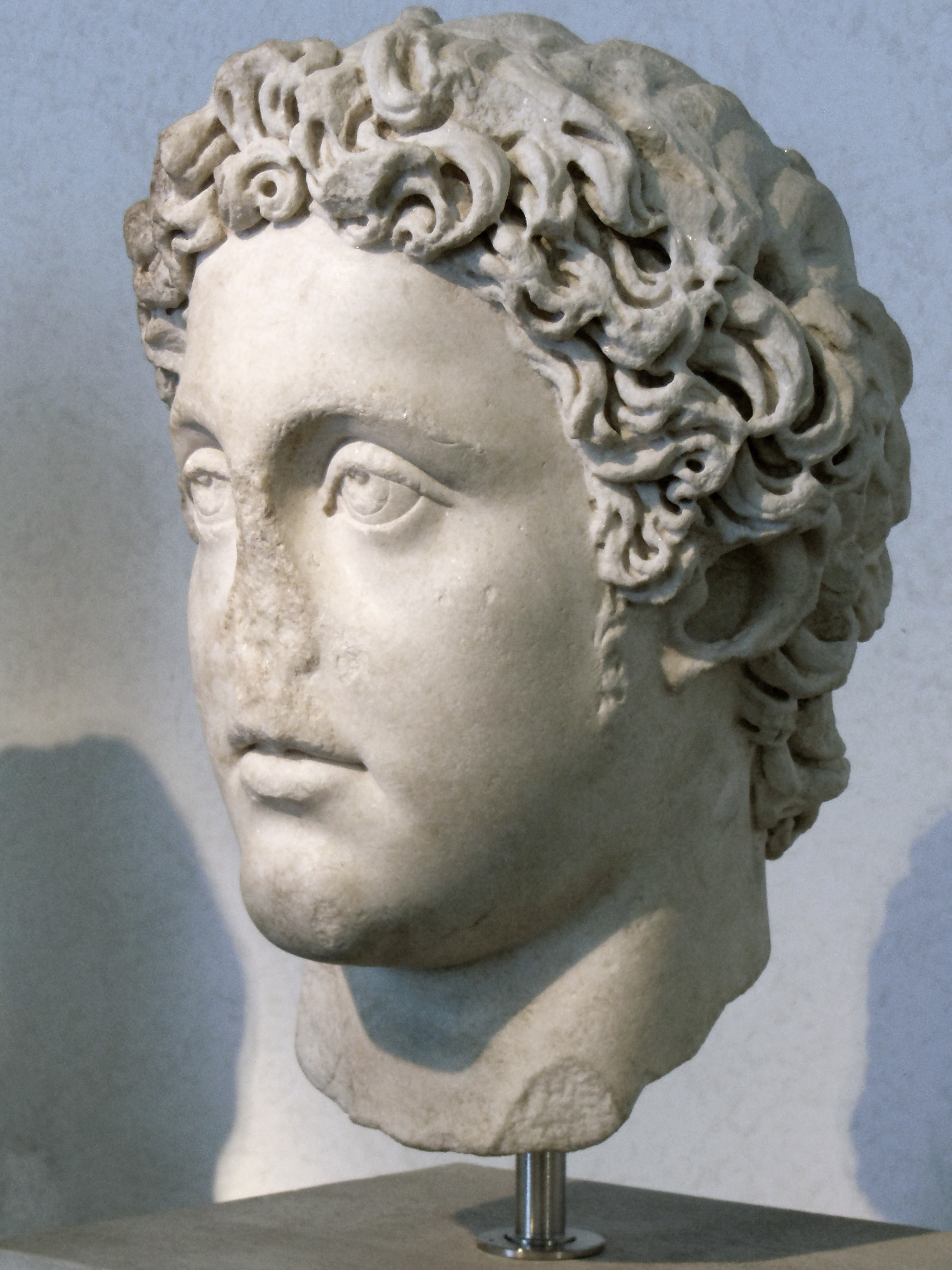
Head of Commodus

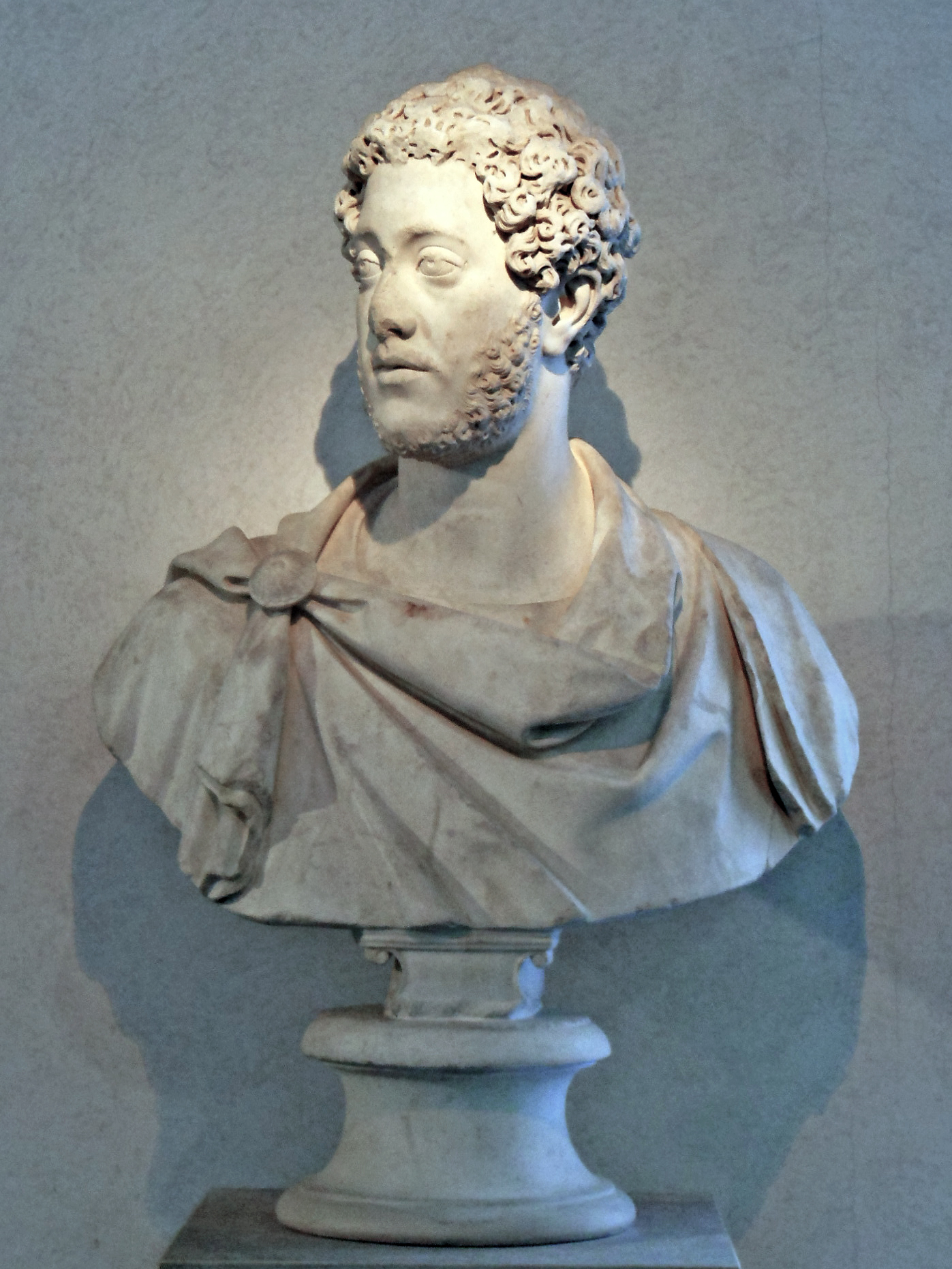
Bust of Commodus from Albano

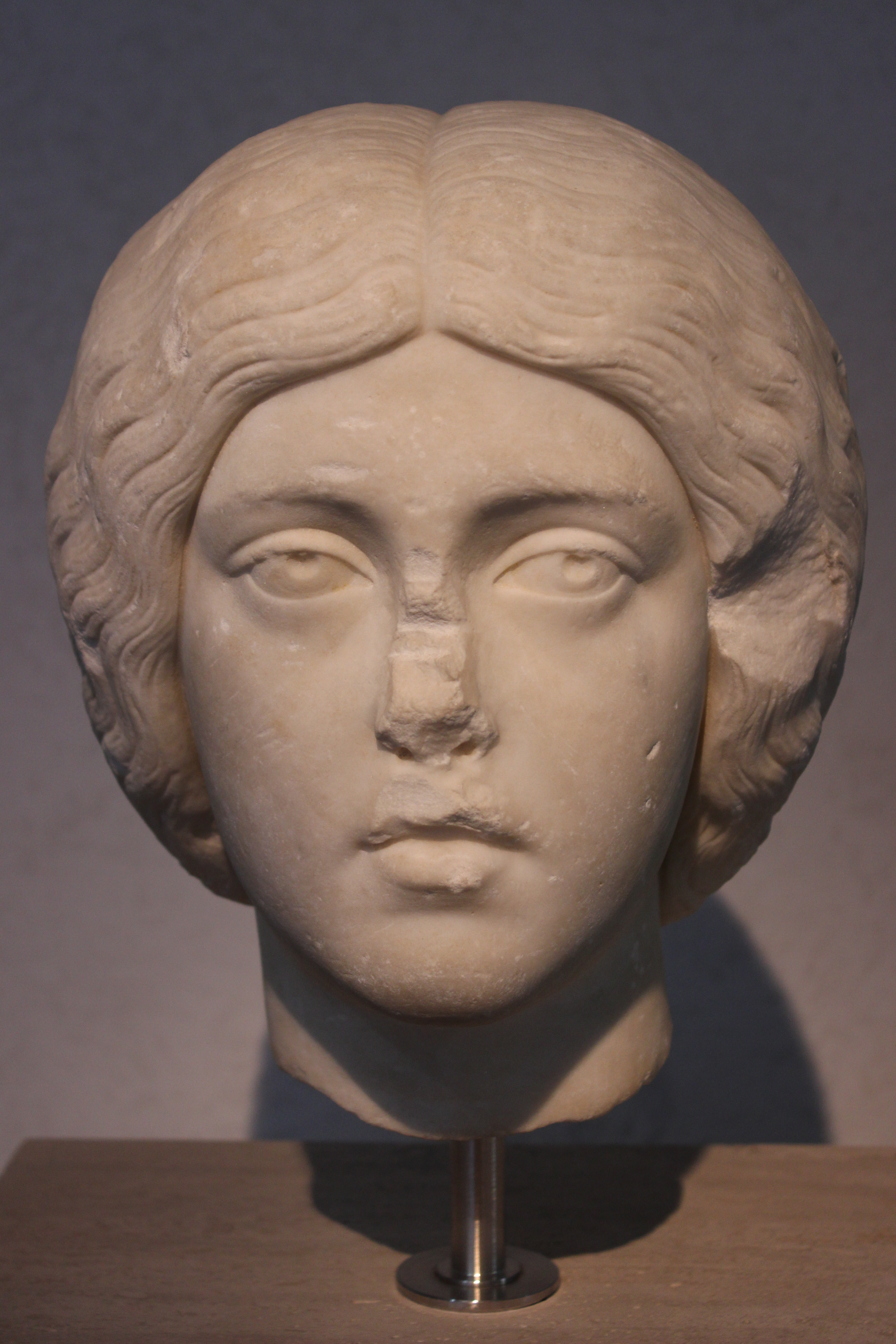
Head of Bruttia Crispina, wife of Commodus

=== Room V (first floor) ===
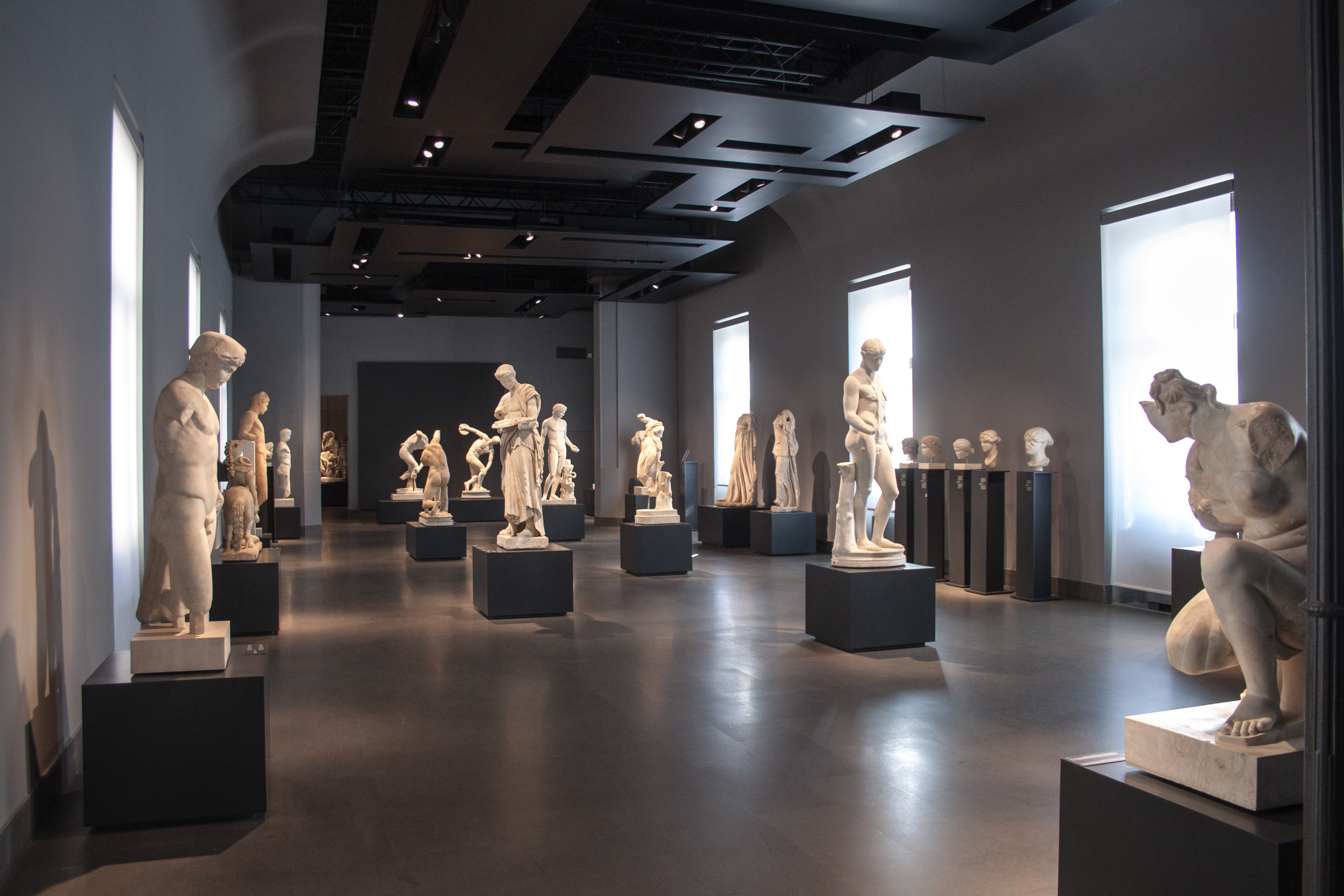
Overview of "room V," with "room VI" in the background

In "Room V" (Magistra graecitas) are a series of ideal sculptures placed in imperial residences, such as Nero's villa in Subiaco and Anzio, or Hadrian's Villa. Here one finds copies and reworkings of Greek originals, with the intention of recreating Hellenistic-like environments. The room shows a series of sculptures of the highest historical-artistic value such as: the headless Ephebos from Subiaco through which the theme of the killing of the Niobids returns; from the villa at Anzio come the famous "Maiden of Anzio," an Apollo, young and almost feminine, an Hermes, as well as an Amazon on horseback fighting with a Celtic warrior on the ground.

From Hadrian's Villa several works are on display. These include a statue of Dionysus and one of Athena (a copy from a bronze original from the fourth century B.C. from the portico of the Villa Adriana's Pecile), a dancing maiden that derives from a Hellenistic original (from the portico of the triclinium of the three exedras), ornamental objects such as the classicist marble krater decorated with cranes and snakes, a head of an Amazon, and two copies of the Crouching Venus (without arms) from Doidalsas of Bithynia (mid-3rd century BCE. C.): a first in Parian marble, from Via Palermo, near the Viminal Palace (1913), originally with Eros and swan (mid-2nd-century A.D. copy); a second from the baths with heliocaminus from Hadrian's Villa (1914) in Pentelic marble (?), a copy from the Hadrianic age.

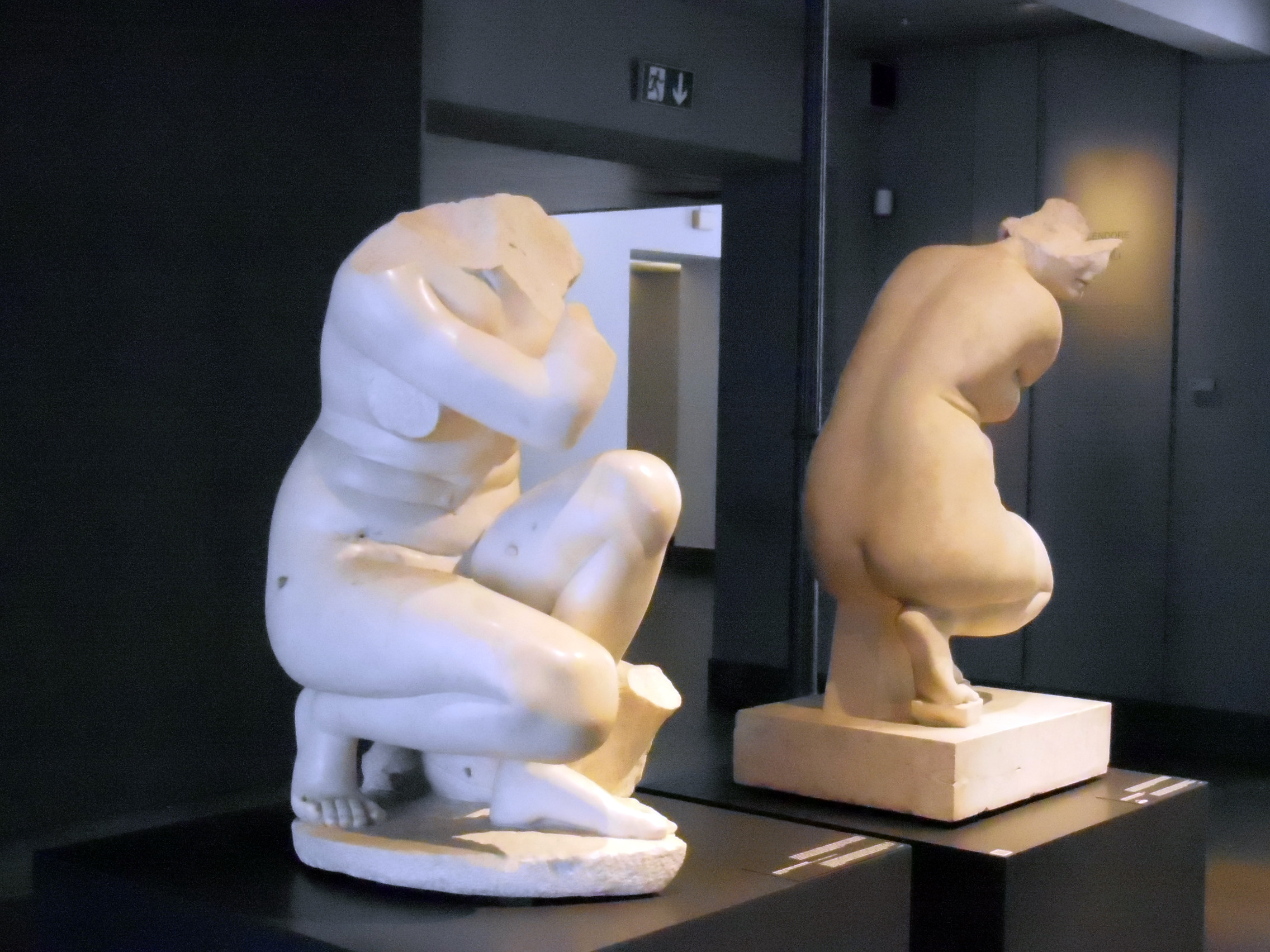
Two copies of Doidalsas' Crouching Venus: left in Parian marble (from Palermo Street, Rome) and right from the baths of Hadrian's Villa.

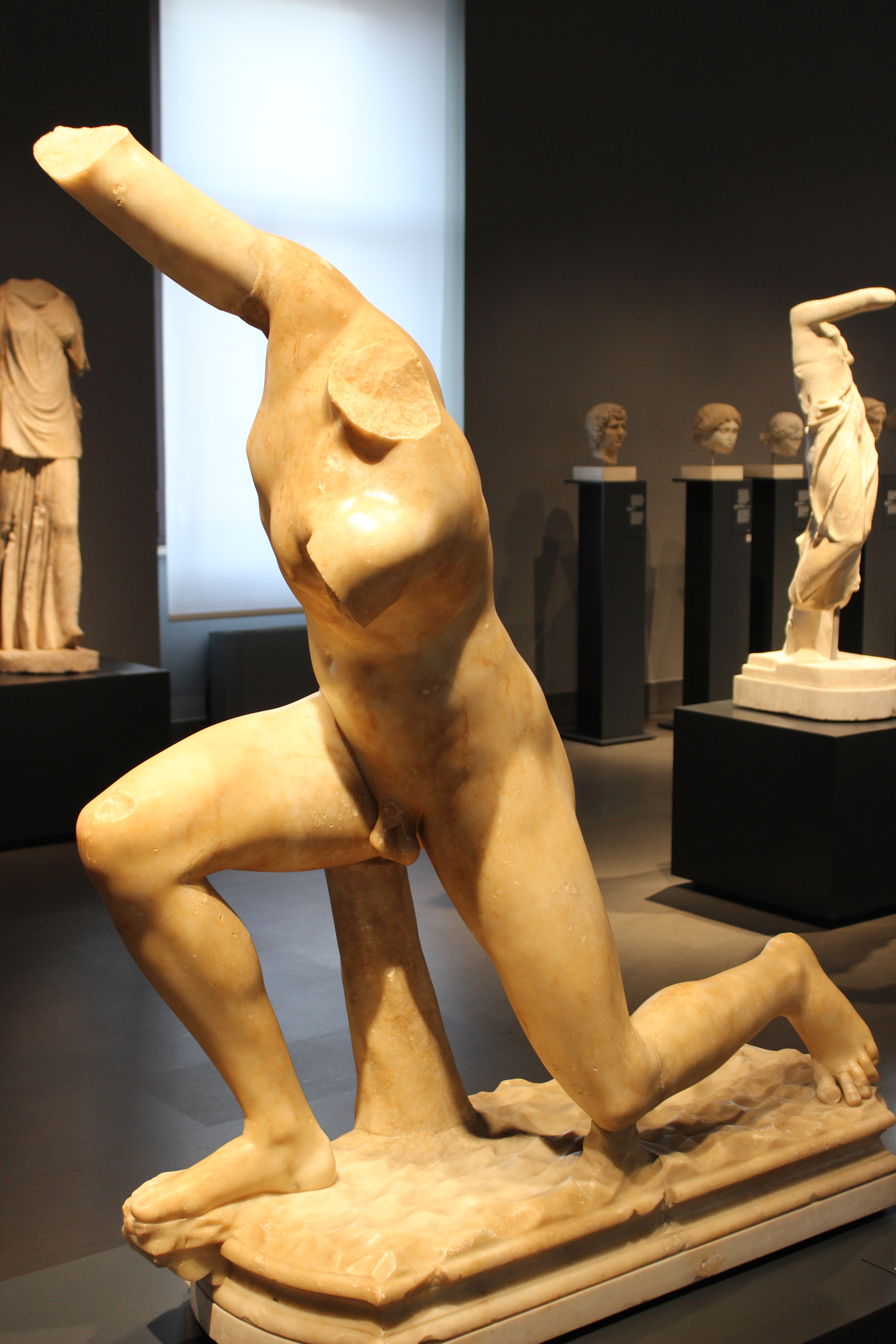
Headless ephebos from Subiaco

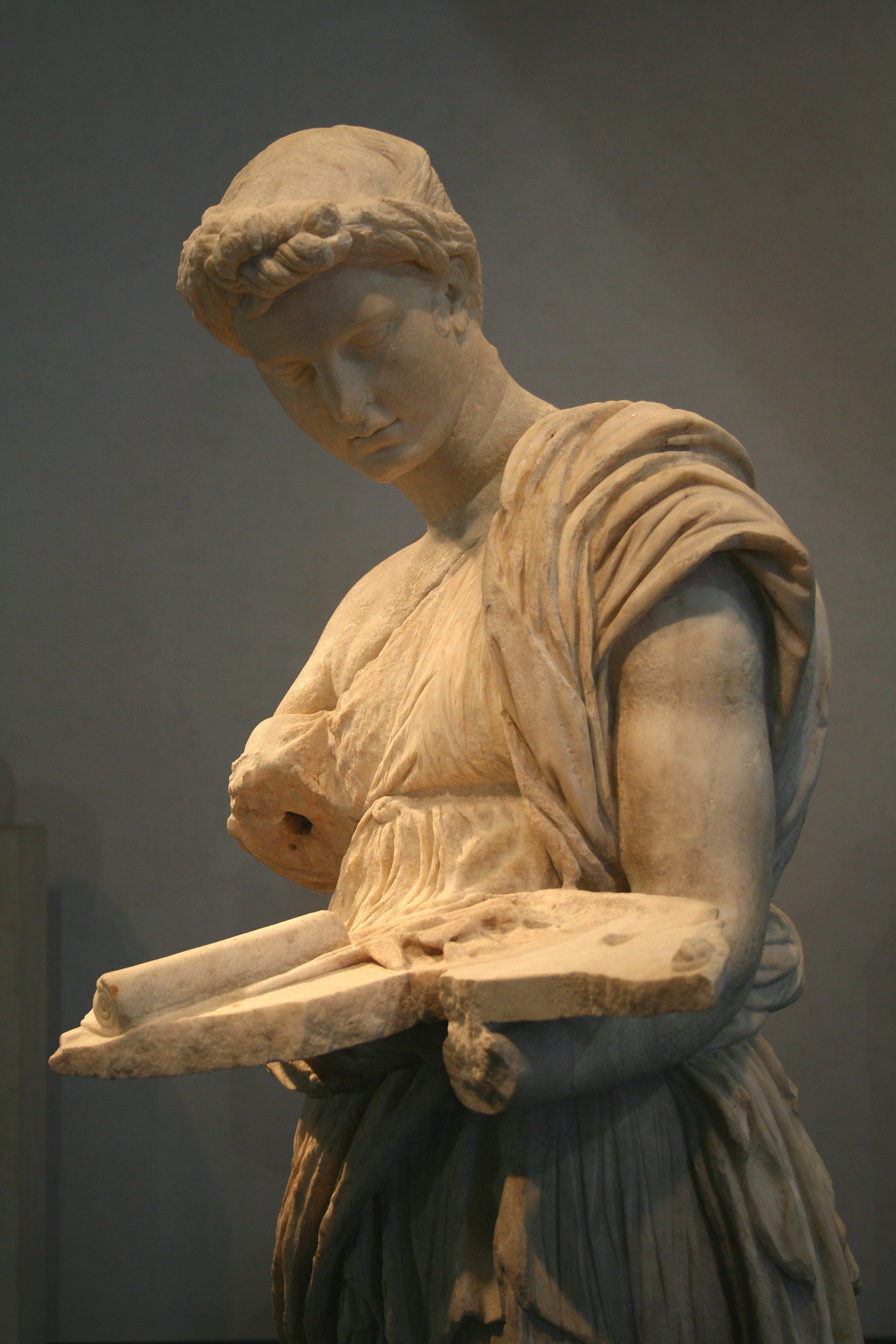
The Maiden of Anzio

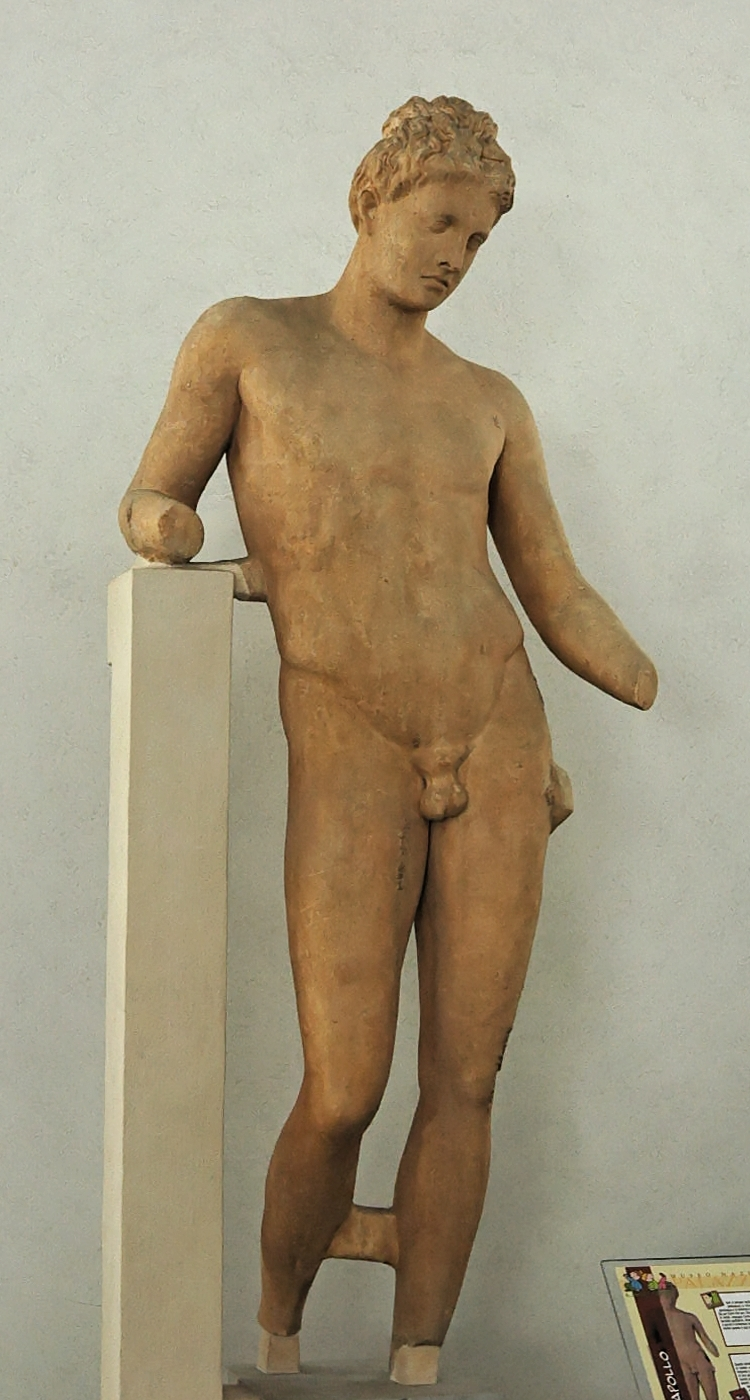
Statue of Apollo (from the state highway Anzio-Ardea; height 186 cm; inv. 121.302)

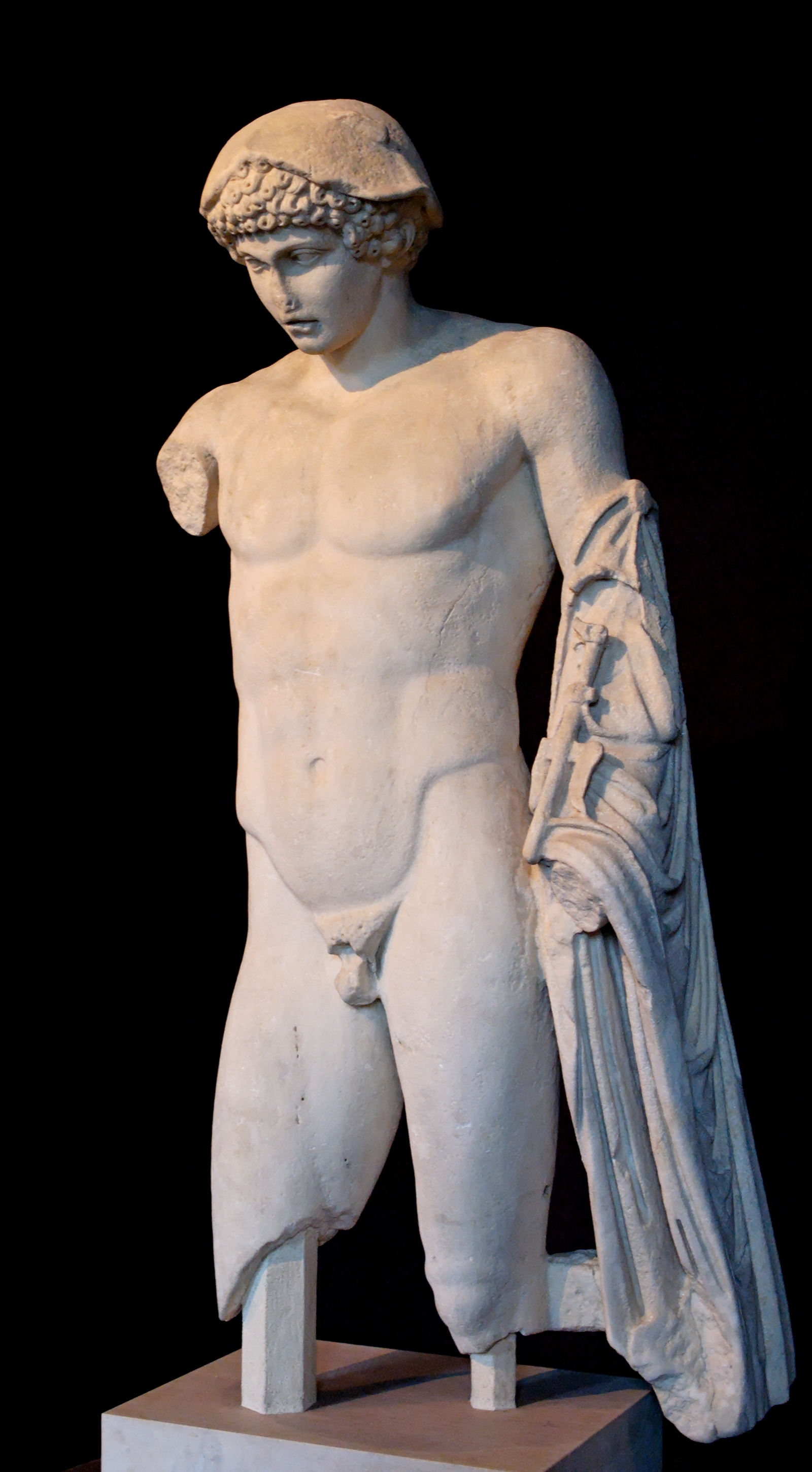
Hermes, 1st-century B.C.E. Roman copy from 5th-century B.C.E. bronze original attributed to a young Phidias (Ludovisi collection)

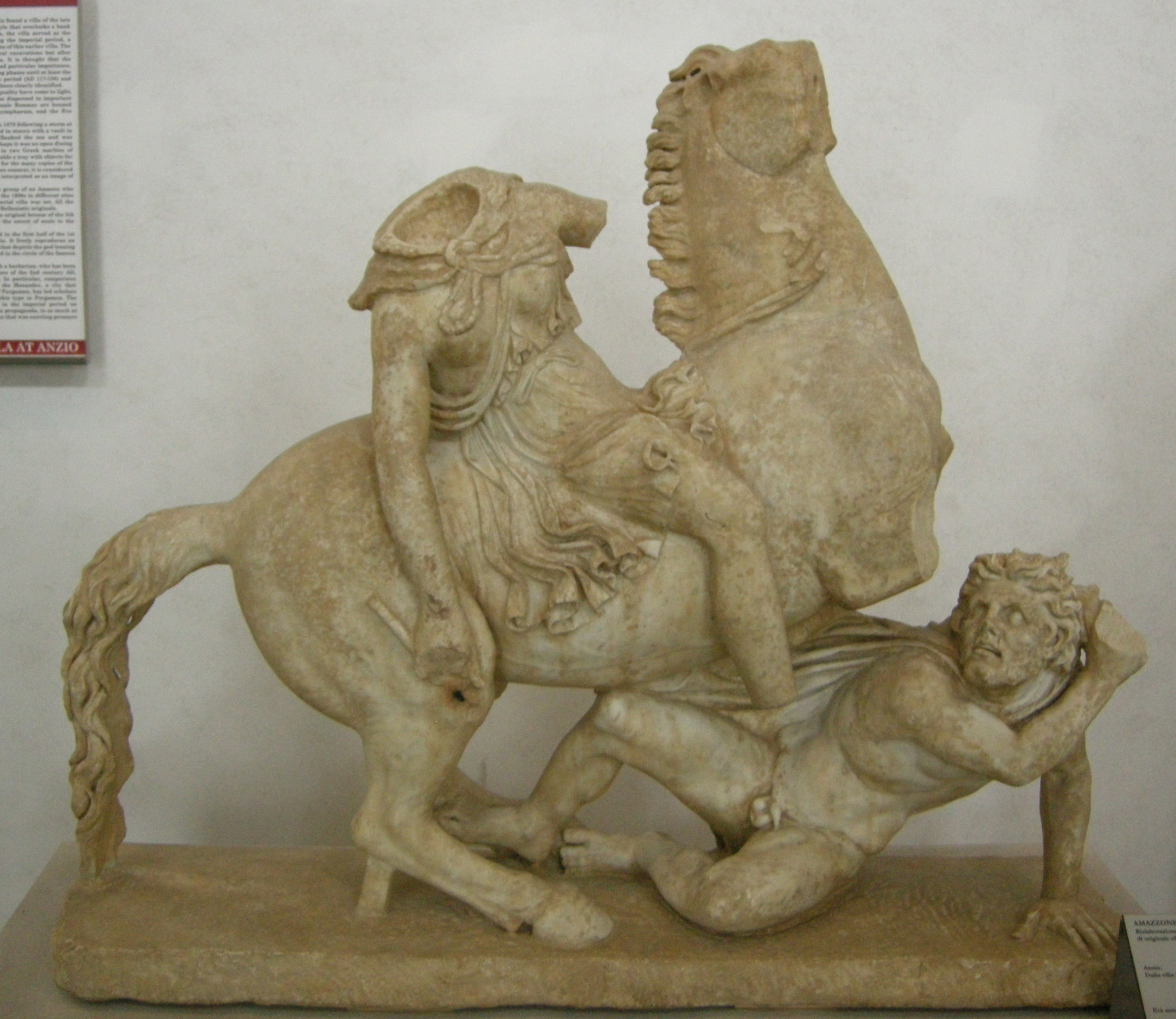
Amazon (headless) fighting a Celt (from Anzio, Antonine age)

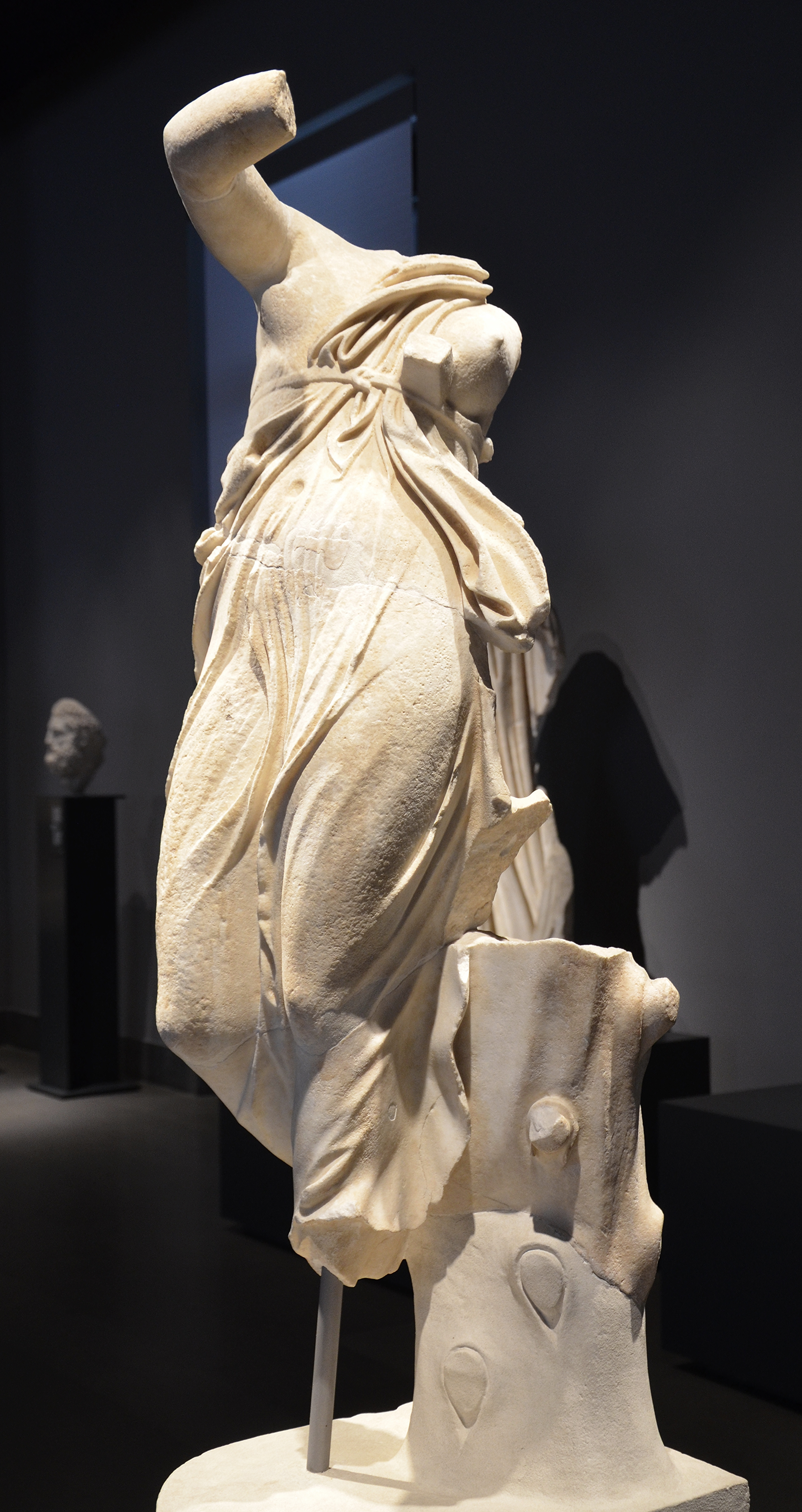
Dancing maiden

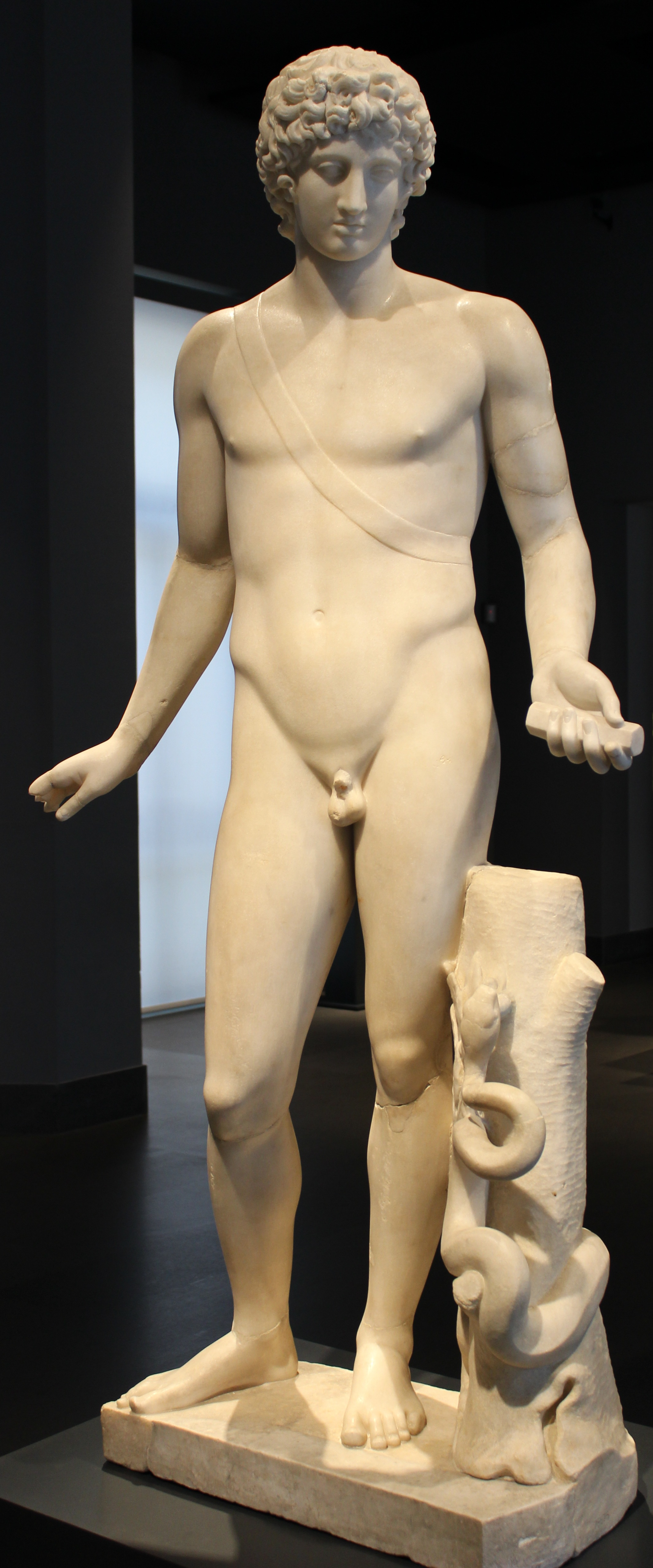
An Apollo, young and almost feminine (from Castelporziano, Chigi type, inv. 75.675)

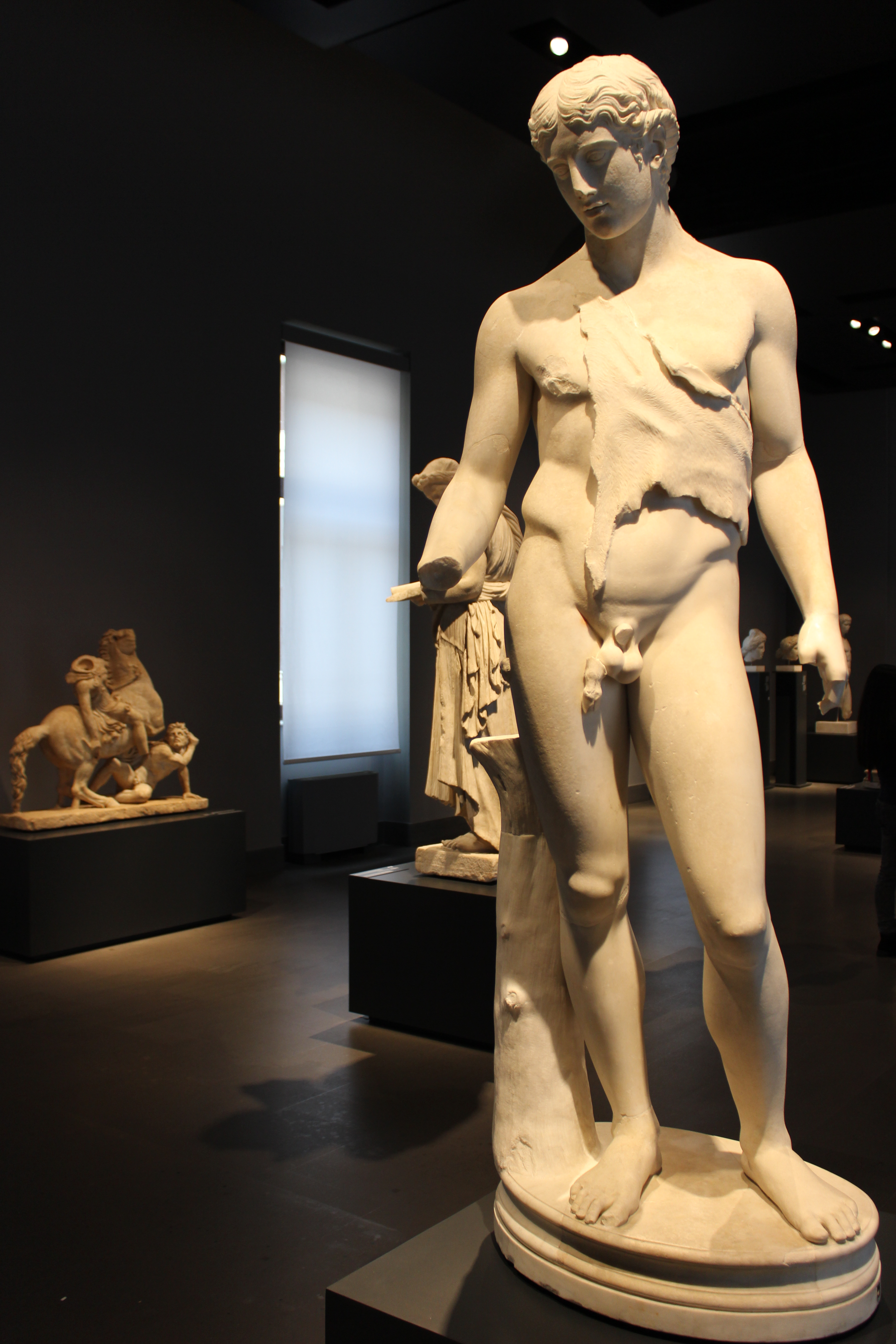
Dionysus from Hadrian's Villa (inv. 622)

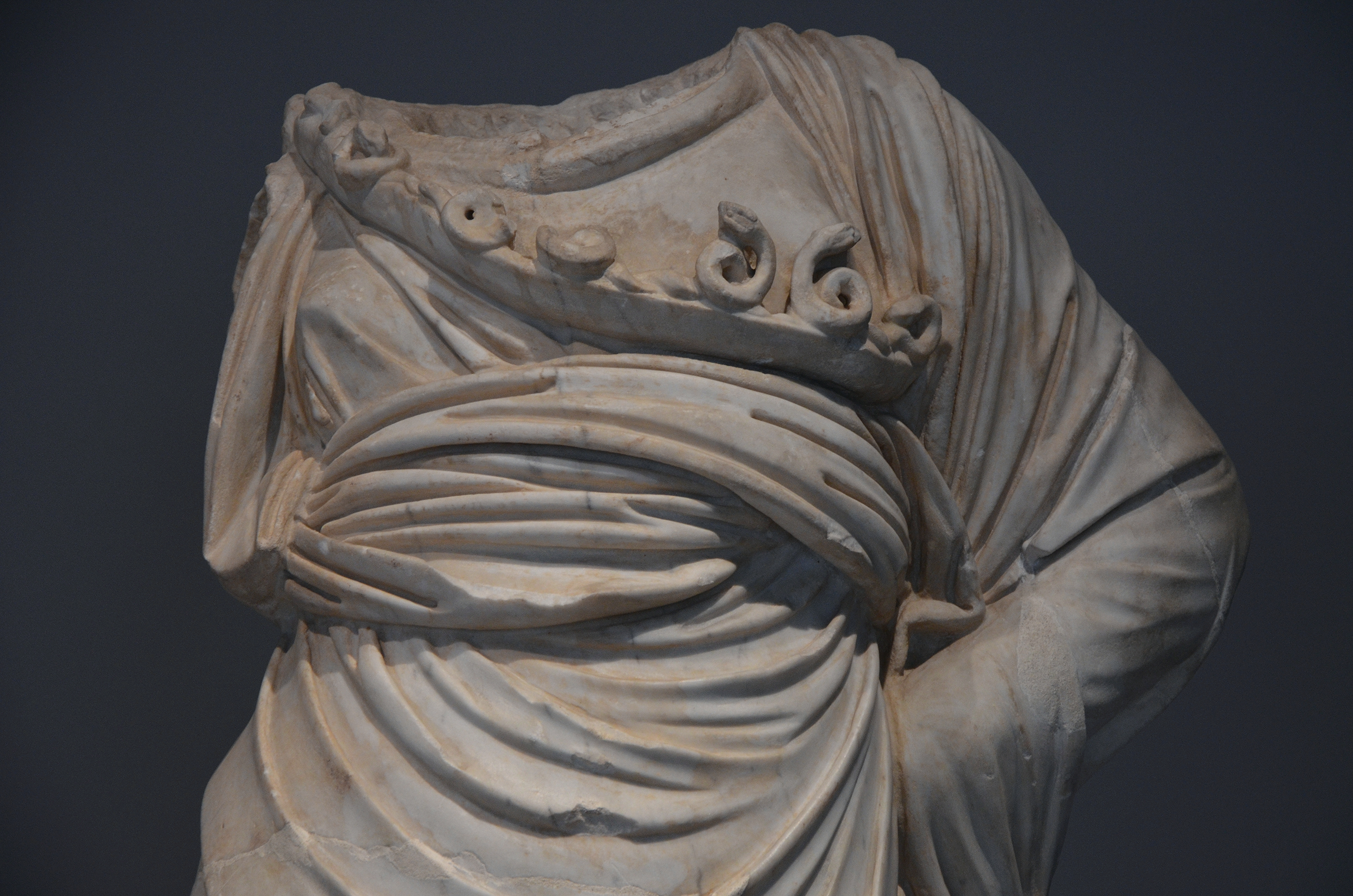
Detail of the statue of Athena (from Hadrian's Villa)
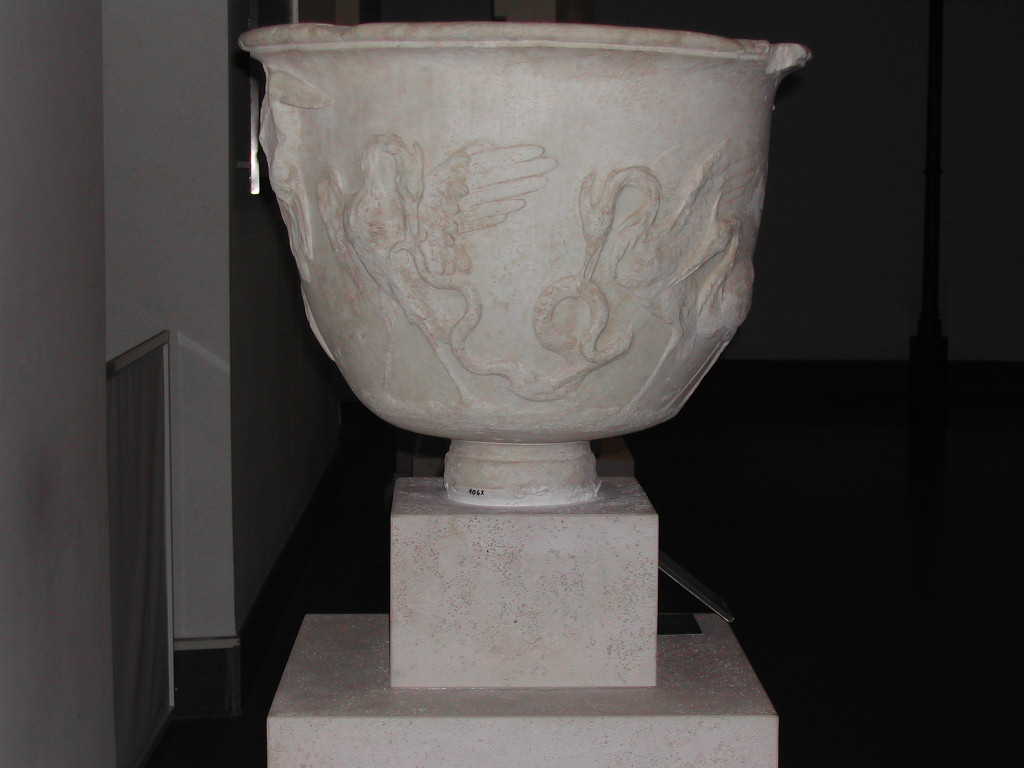
A classical marble krater decorated with cranes and snakes

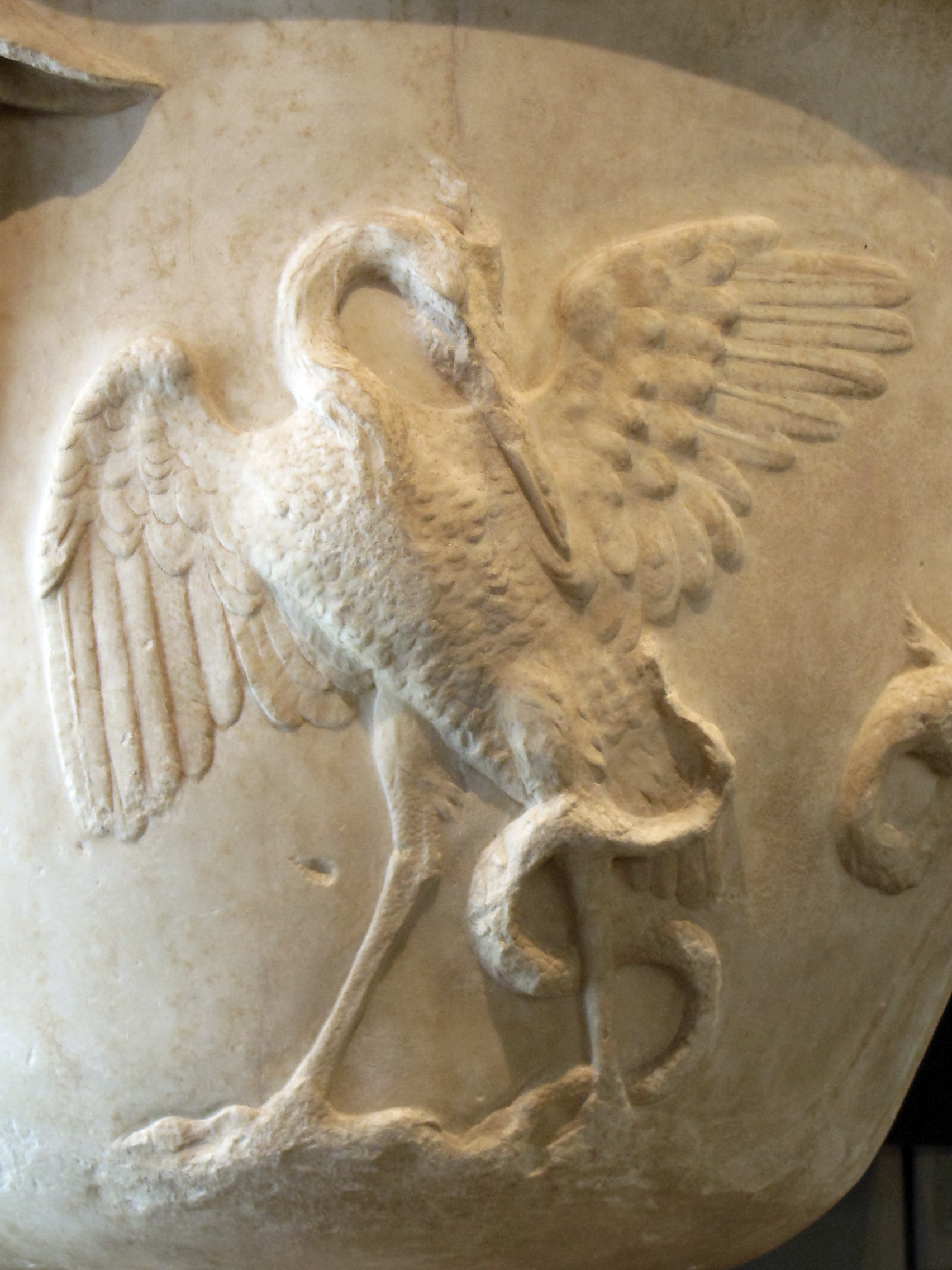
Detail of marble krater decorated with cranes and snakes

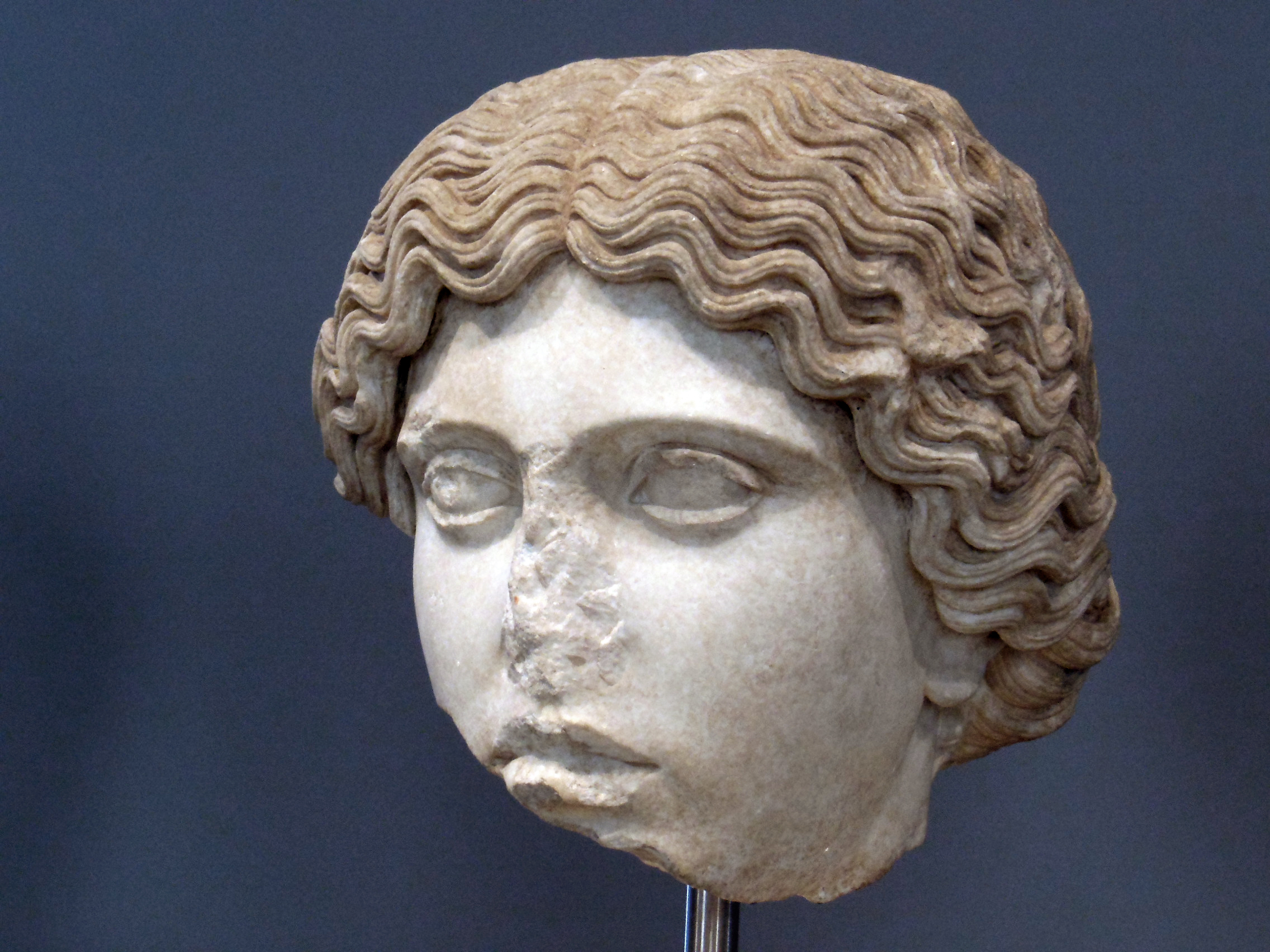
Amazon head of Mattei type, Roman copy from Greek original by Phidias from Hadrian's Villa (cryptoporticus between stadium and libraries), in Parian marble.

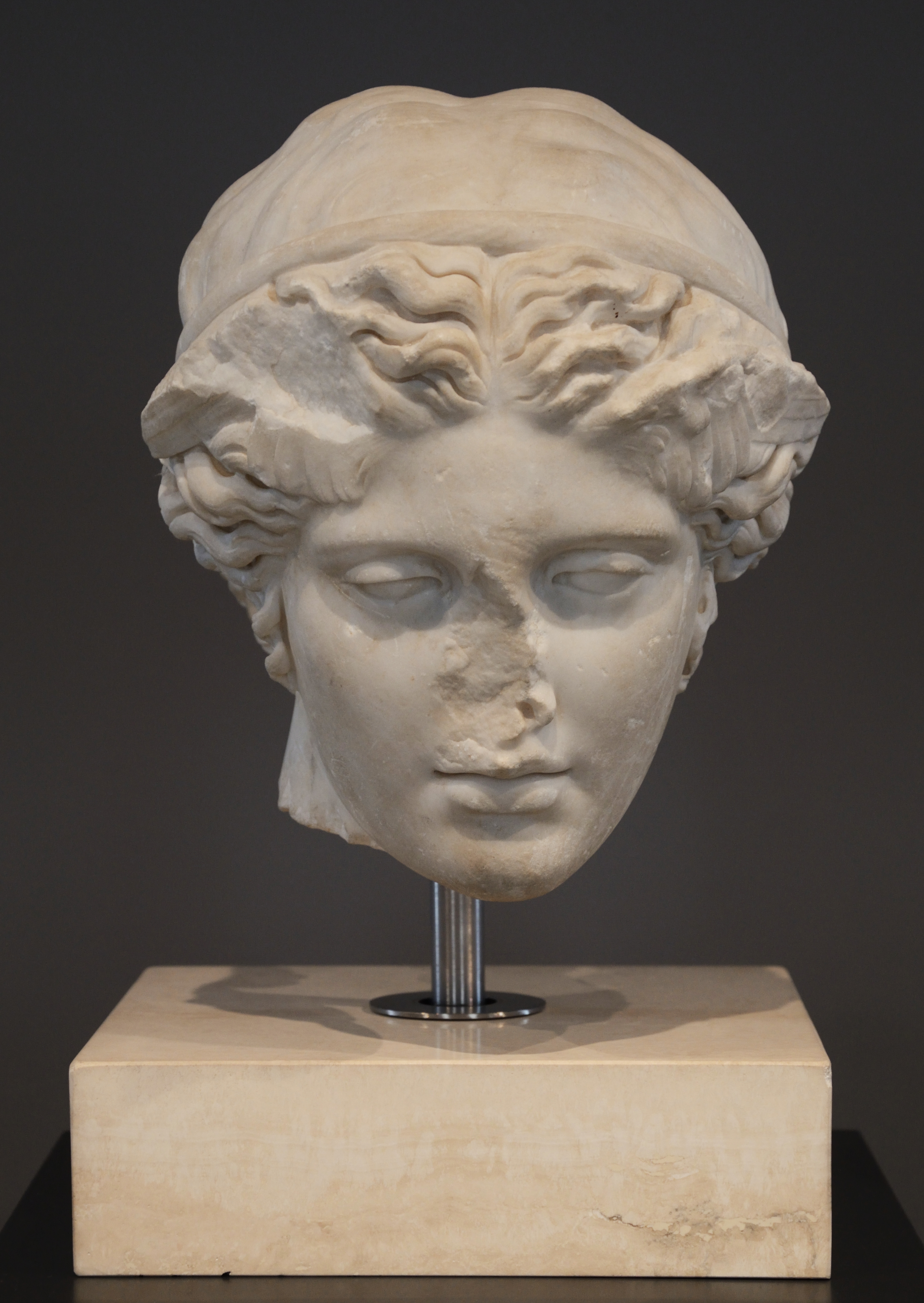
Hypnos from Hadrian's Villa (found inside a cryptoporticus from the entrance of Piazza d'Oro)

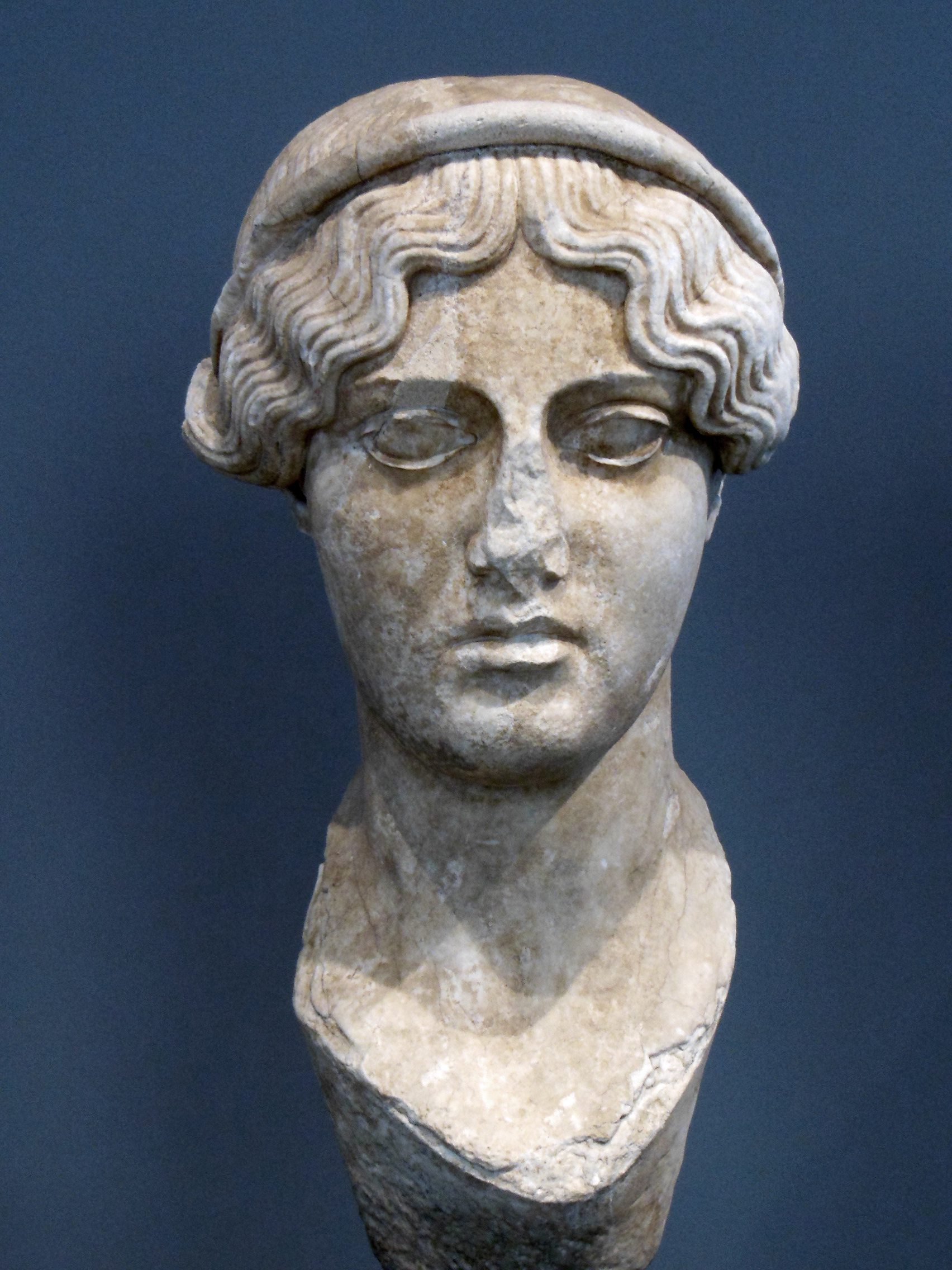
Female diademed head from Hadrian's Villa (cryptoporticus at the temple of Knidian Aphrodite)

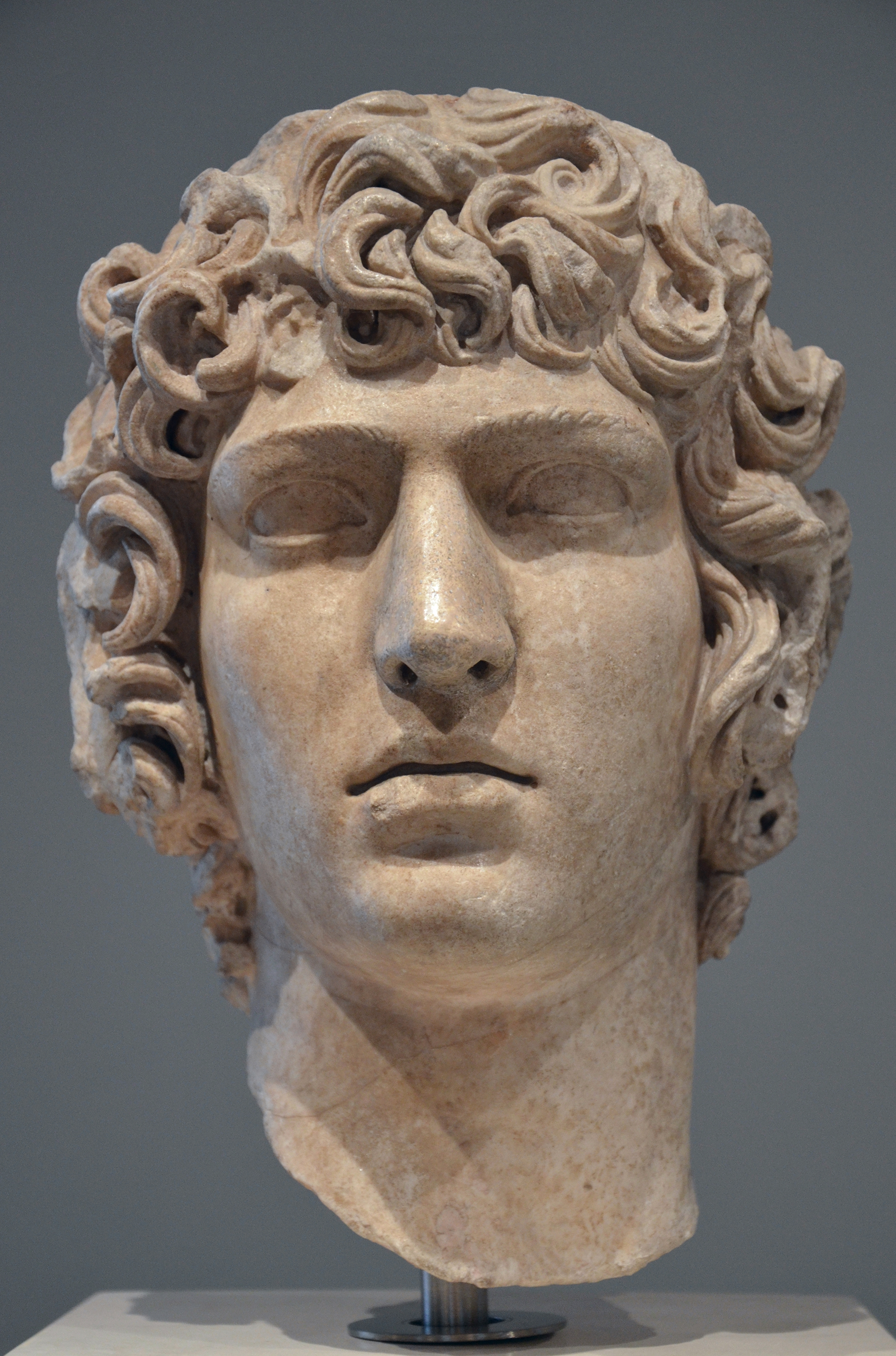
Portrait of Antinous, Hadrian's lover, from Hadrian's Villa

=== Room VI (first floor) ===
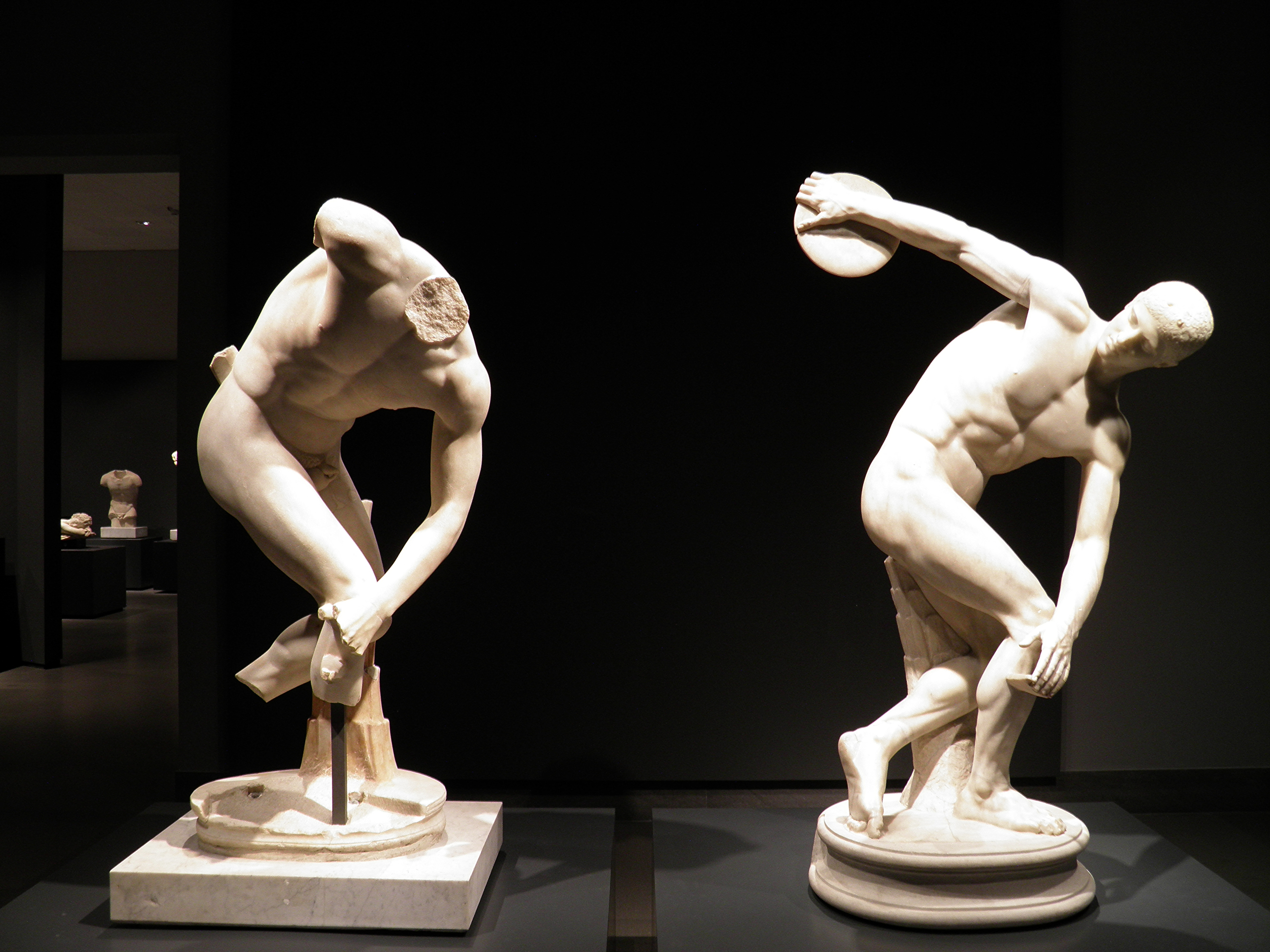
The Lancellotti Discobolus and a headless, fragmentary statue of the discobolus at Castelporziano

The entrance to "Room VI" features the Apollo of the Tiber by a Neo-Attic sculptor of the Augustan age who was probably inspired by early Phidias. This room is dedicated to sculptures used to reconstruct the atmosphere of the gymnasium (ornamenta gymnasii). In the center of the room are two Roman copies from the Hadrianic period of the famous Discobolus of Myron (5th century B.C.): the Lancellotti Discobolus, from the 1781 Esquiline excavations (from Villa Palombara), and the headless Castelporziano Discobolus. Also part of the room are the ephebe athlete Monteverde, two heads of Praxiteles' Lycian-type Apollo, other copies of statues of athletes, including a head of Lysippos and a torso (copy from an original of the Polyclitean school).

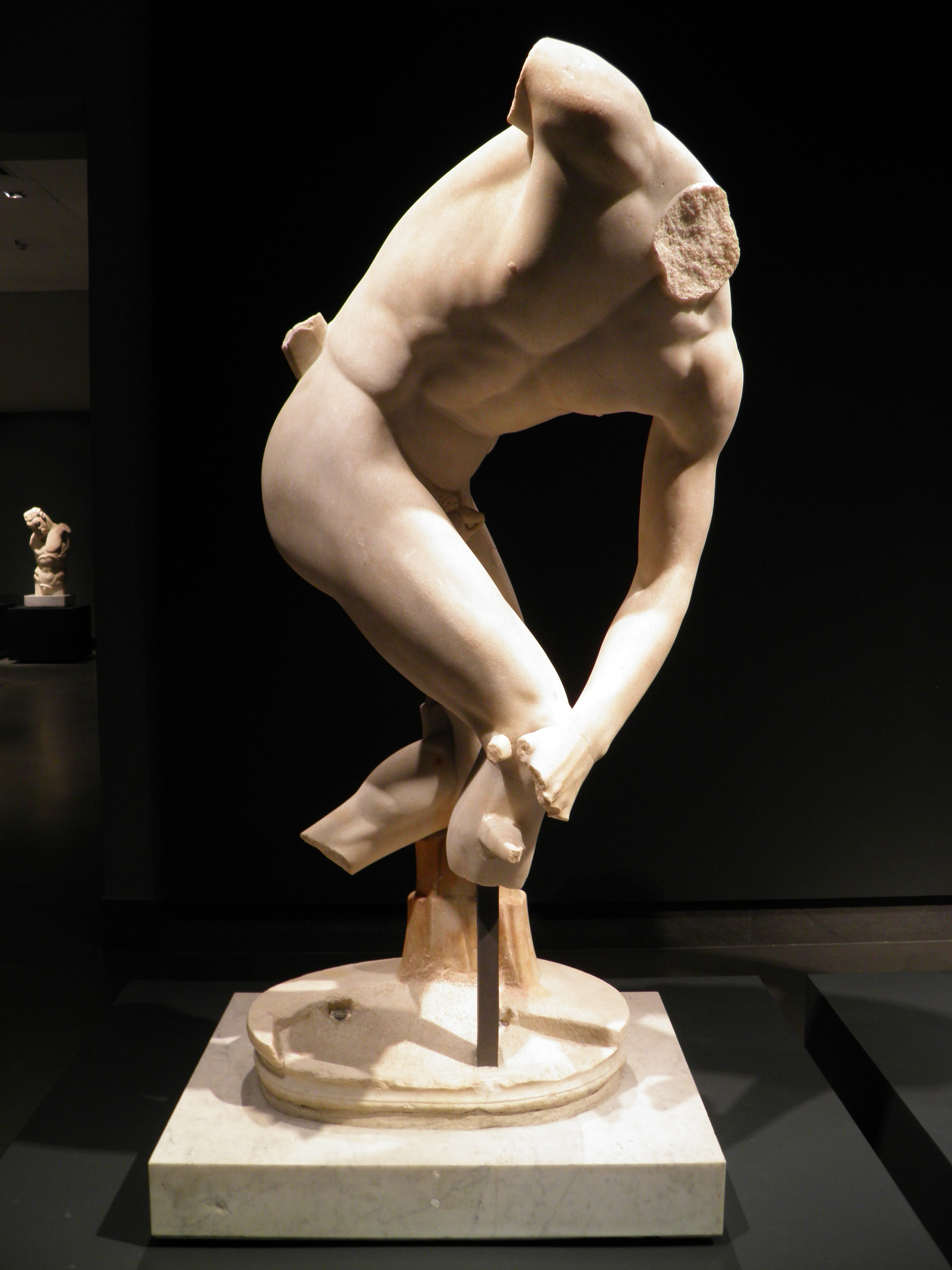
The Discobolus of Castelporziano (height 148 cm; inv. 56.039)

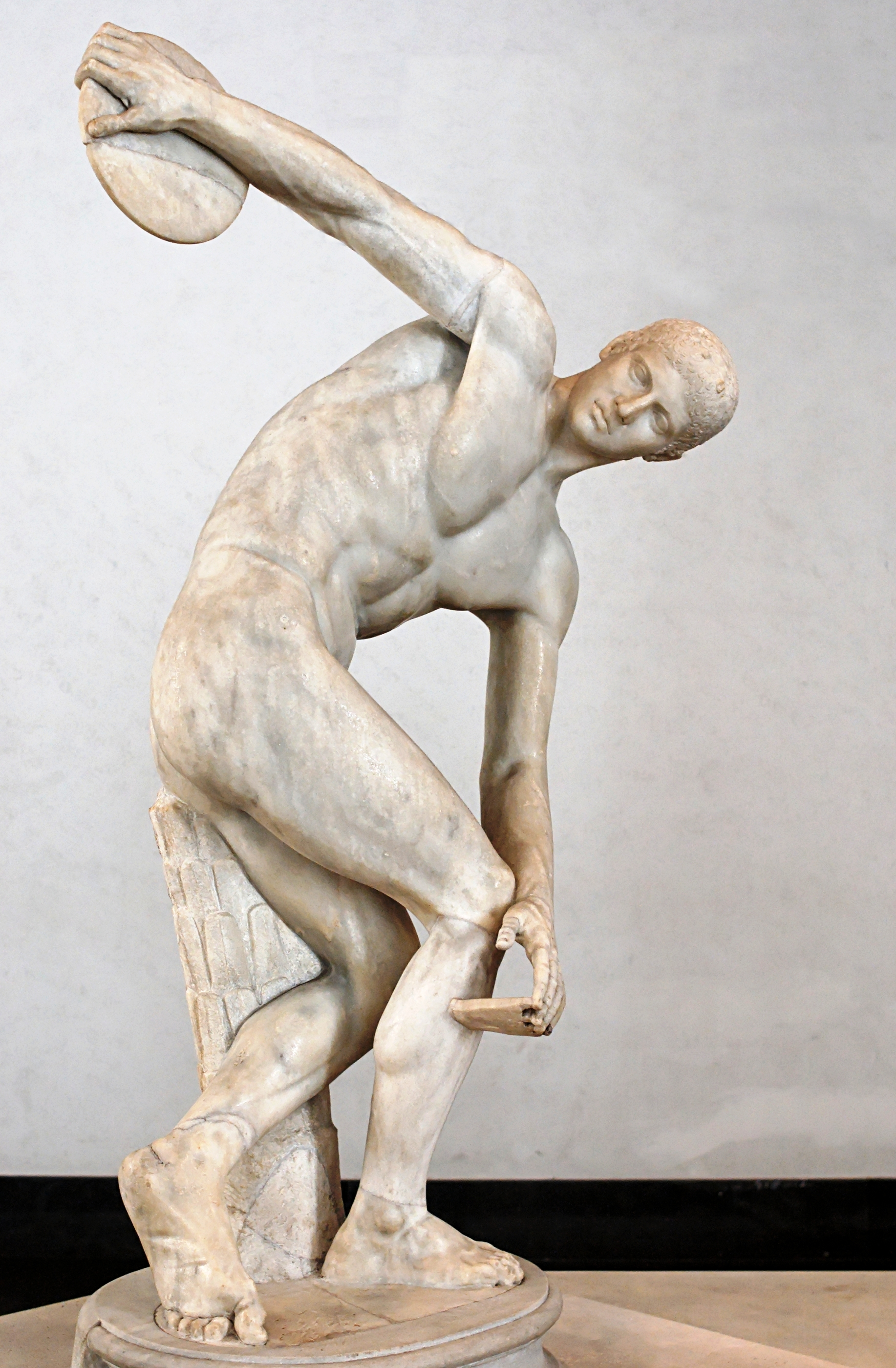
The Lancellotti Discobolus (height 155 cm; inv.126,371)

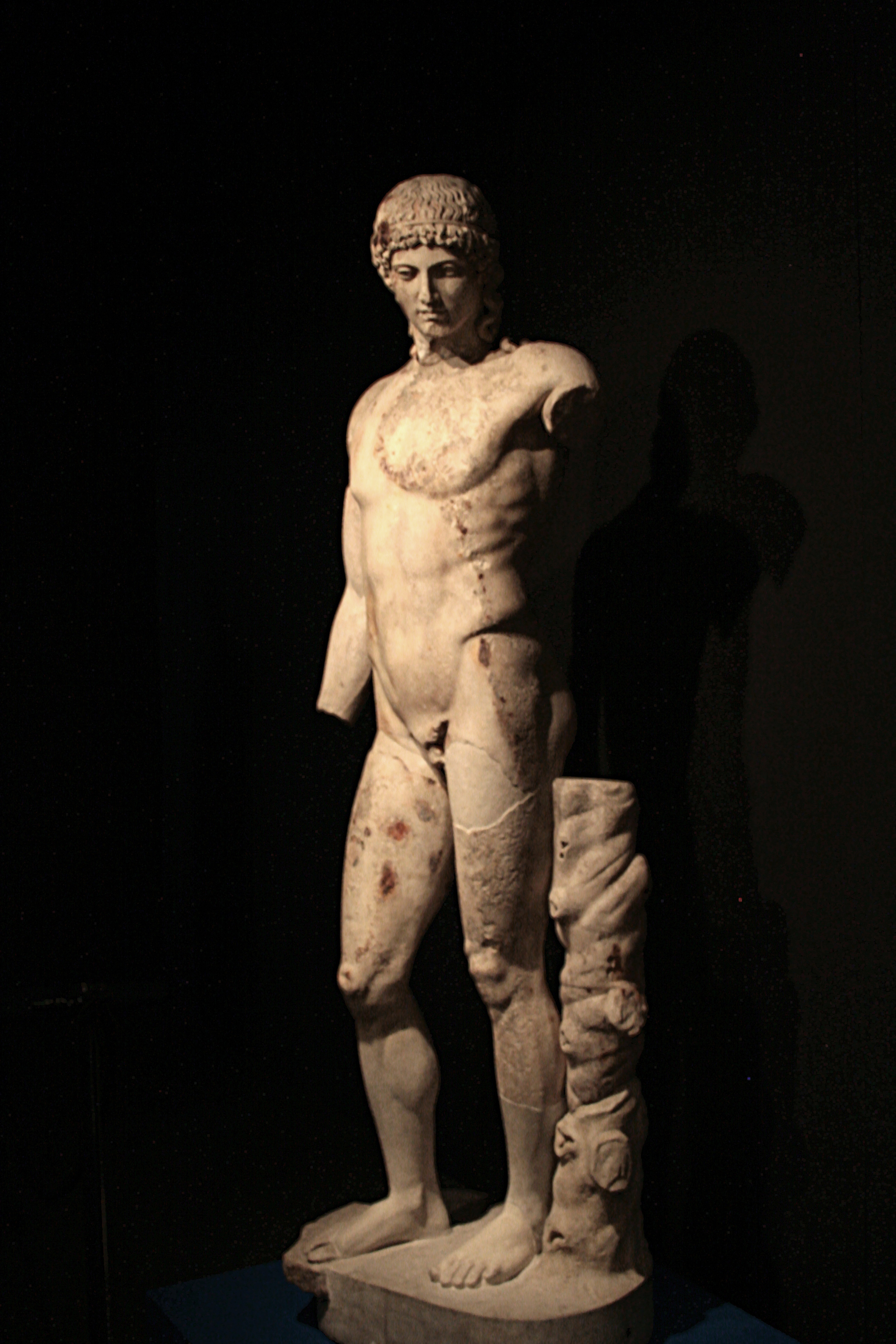
The Tiber Apollo (found in 1891; inv. 608; height 204 cm)

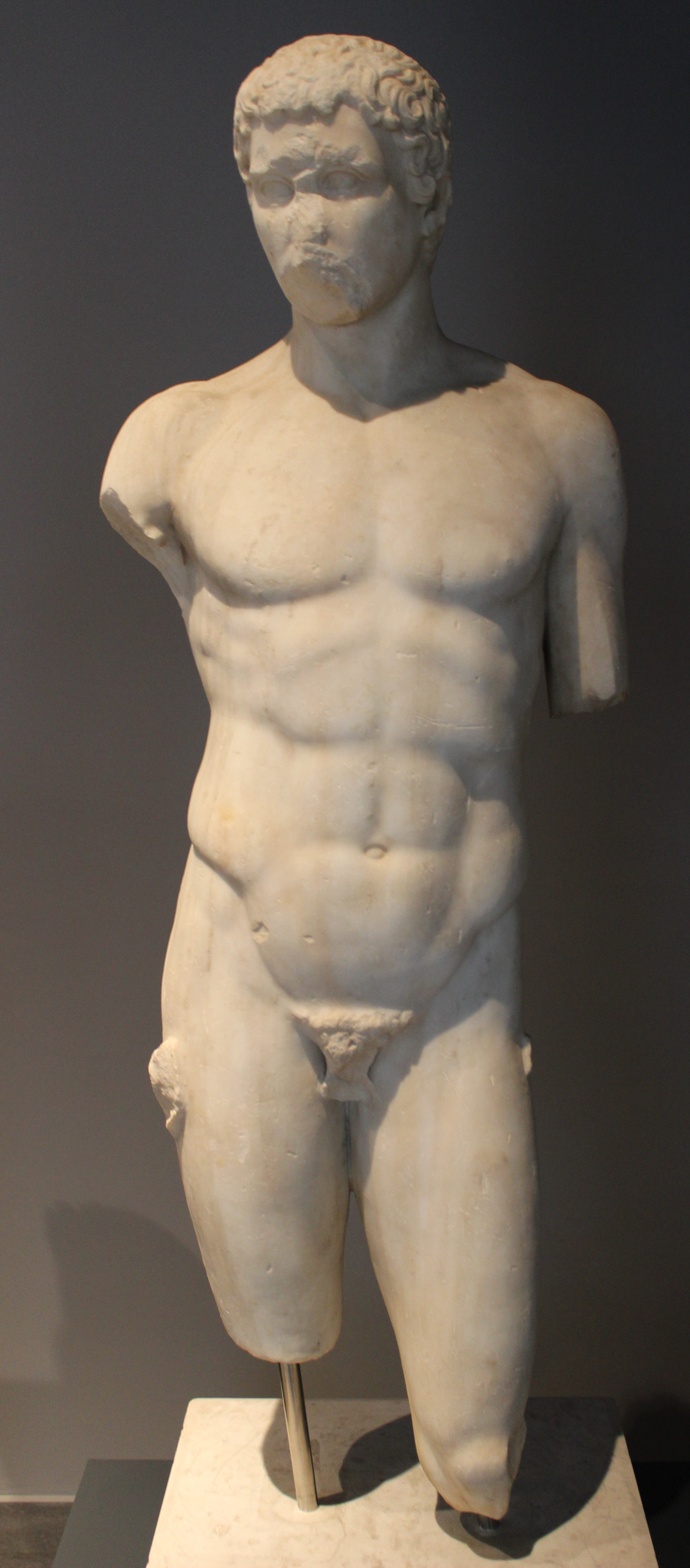
Monteverdi-type ephebe athlete (height 130 cm; inv. 75.219)

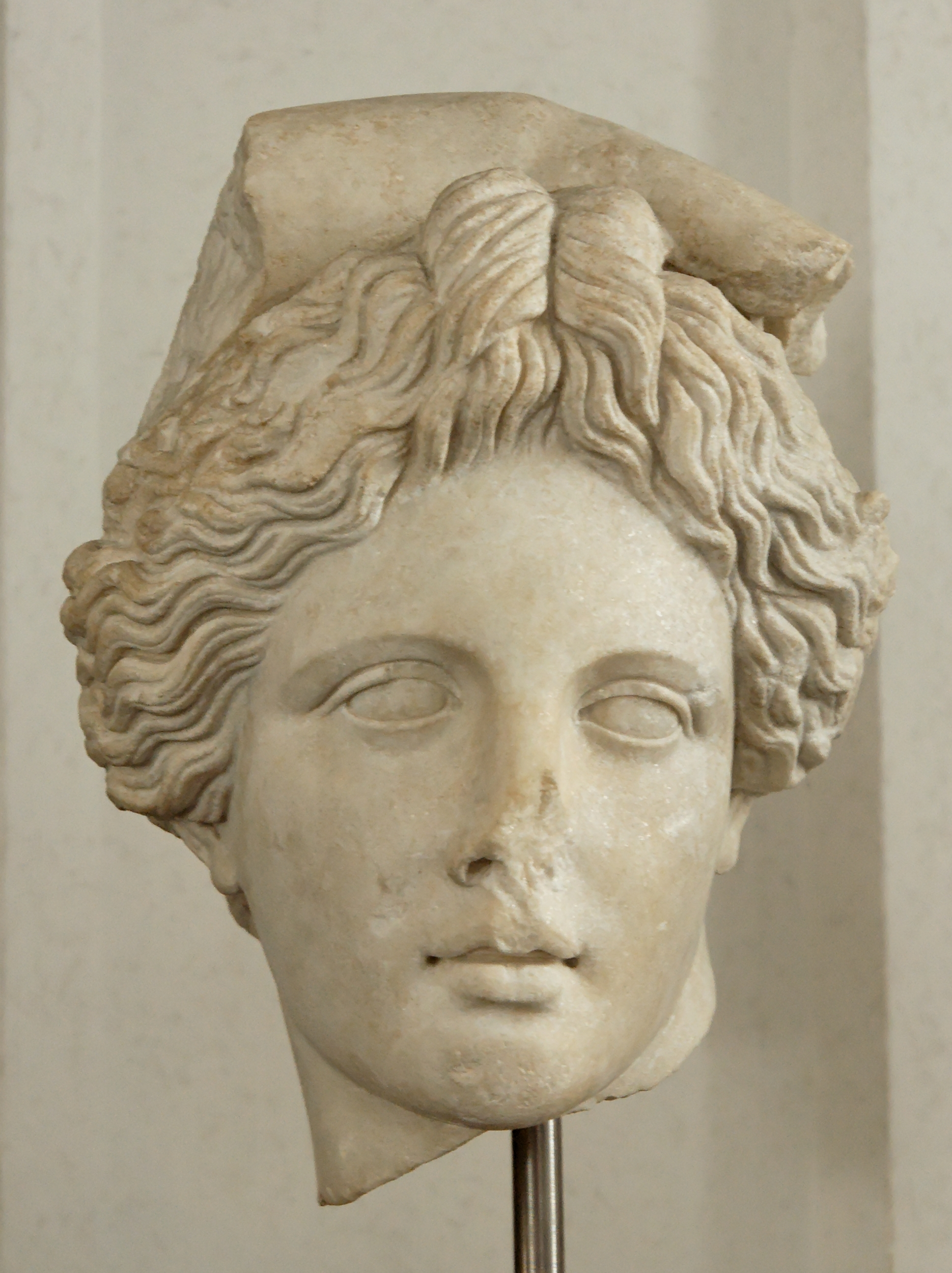
Head of Apollo, Praxiteles Lyceum type (height 30 cm; inv. 55.336; from Rome, Via Giolitti; early 2nd century)

=== Room VII (first floor) ===
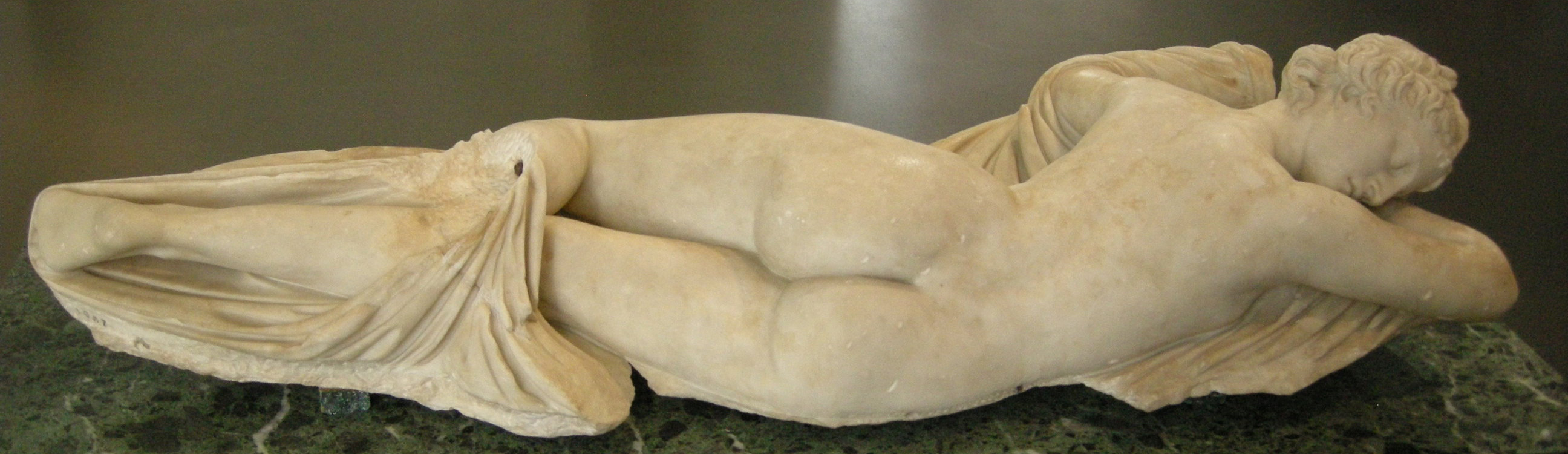
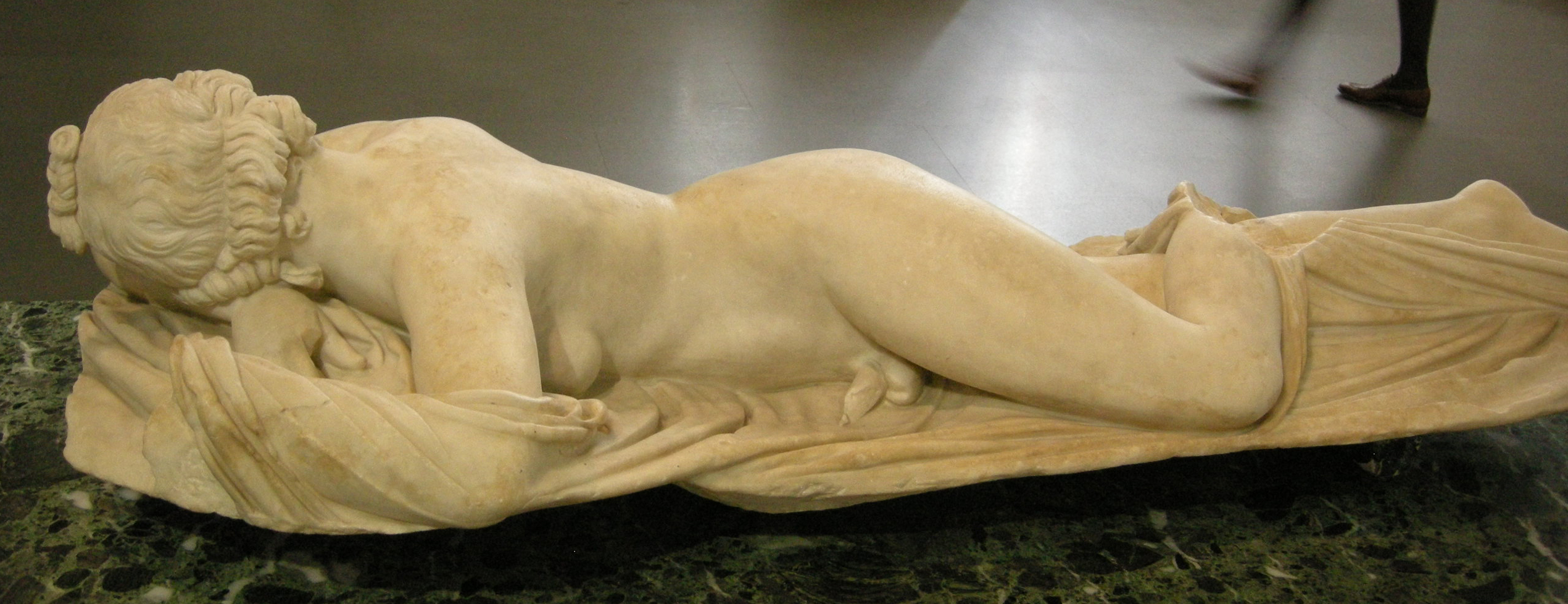
The Sleeping Hermaphrodite seen on both sides

"Room VII" is an area devoted to divine figures, which, always used in villas and town houses, were intended to illustrate cultural values and the pantheon of gods of ancient Greece, but also the joy of life, as in the case of the African Acrobat, the Flautist Satyr, a naked Apollo and one in citharist costume, the Artemis armed with a headless quiver, Dionysus in the guise of Sardanapalus (from the Appian Way and probably derived from an original from the late 4th century BCE. B.C.) and a bronze youth (from the banks of the Tiber, of Hadrianic age that was inspired by models from the fourth century B.C.), Athena, Pan, Crouching Venus (marble copy from the bronze original by Doidalsas), the Eros archer by Lysippos (Villa dei Quintili on the Appian Way), a Thetis with a triton, and finally the Sleeping Hermaphrodite.

The Sleeping Hermaphrodite depicts a young figure, sleeping on their cloak, with head resting on the right arm. The body lies on its side. The rear view, with the buttocks provocatively in the foreground, suggests the beauty of a female body. The front view, on the other hand, shows the erect male sex organ, which reveals the identity of the Hermaphrodite. According to the Latin poet Ovid, he was a boy of great beauty who was transformed into an androgynous being with a dual sexual identity through a supernatural union with the nymph Salmacis.

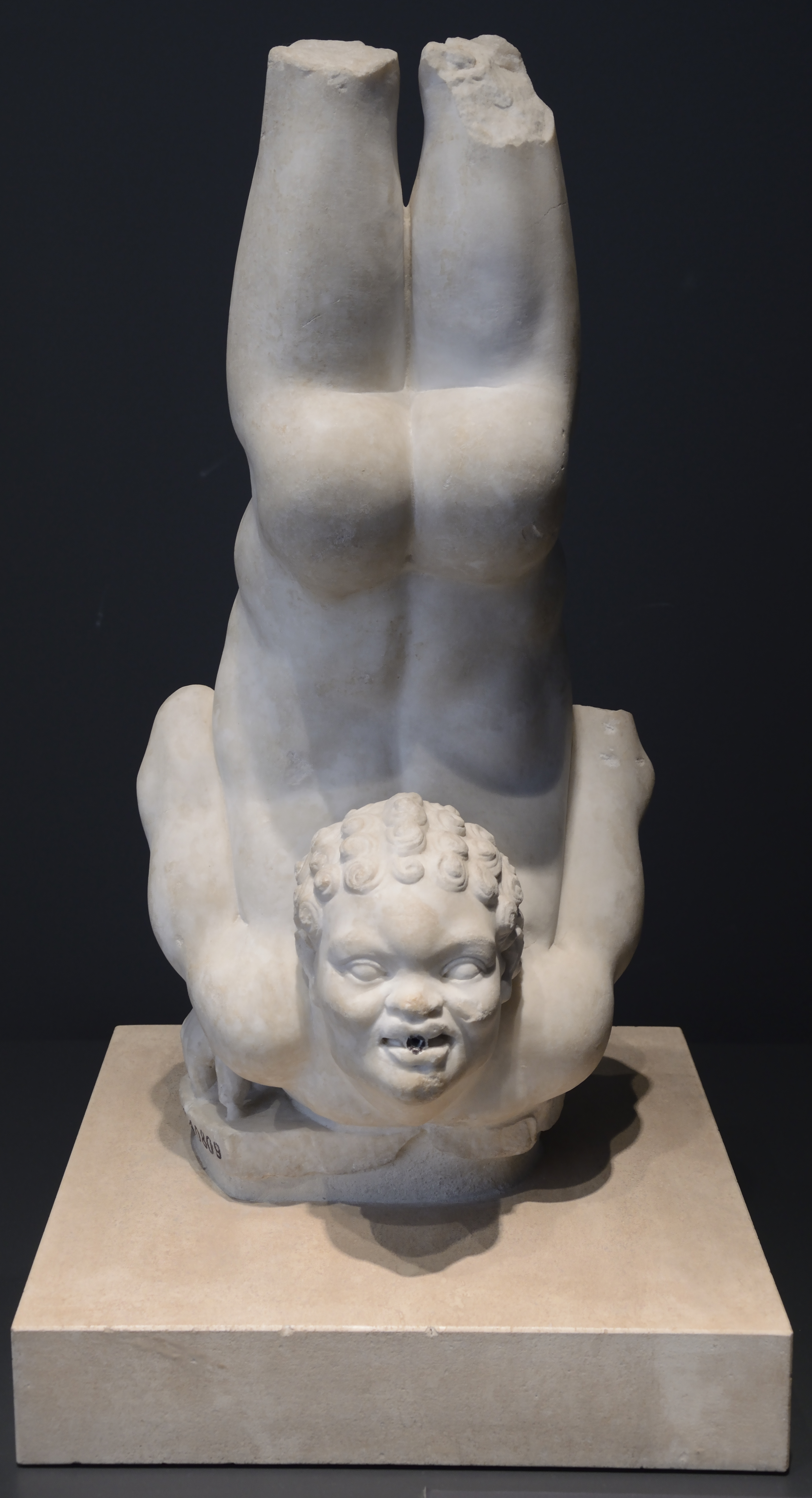
Statue of an African acrobat

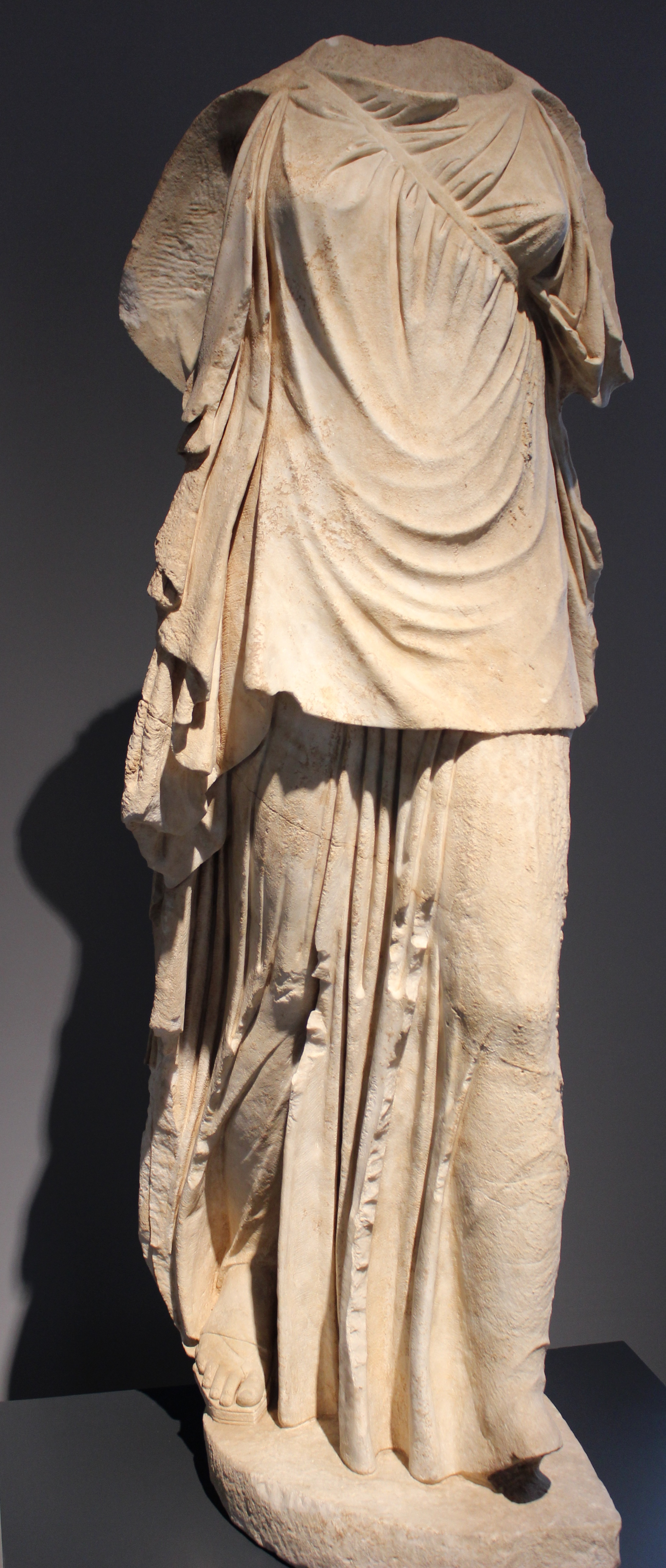
Headless statue of Artemis (Villa dei Quintili; height 159 cm; inv. 107,682)

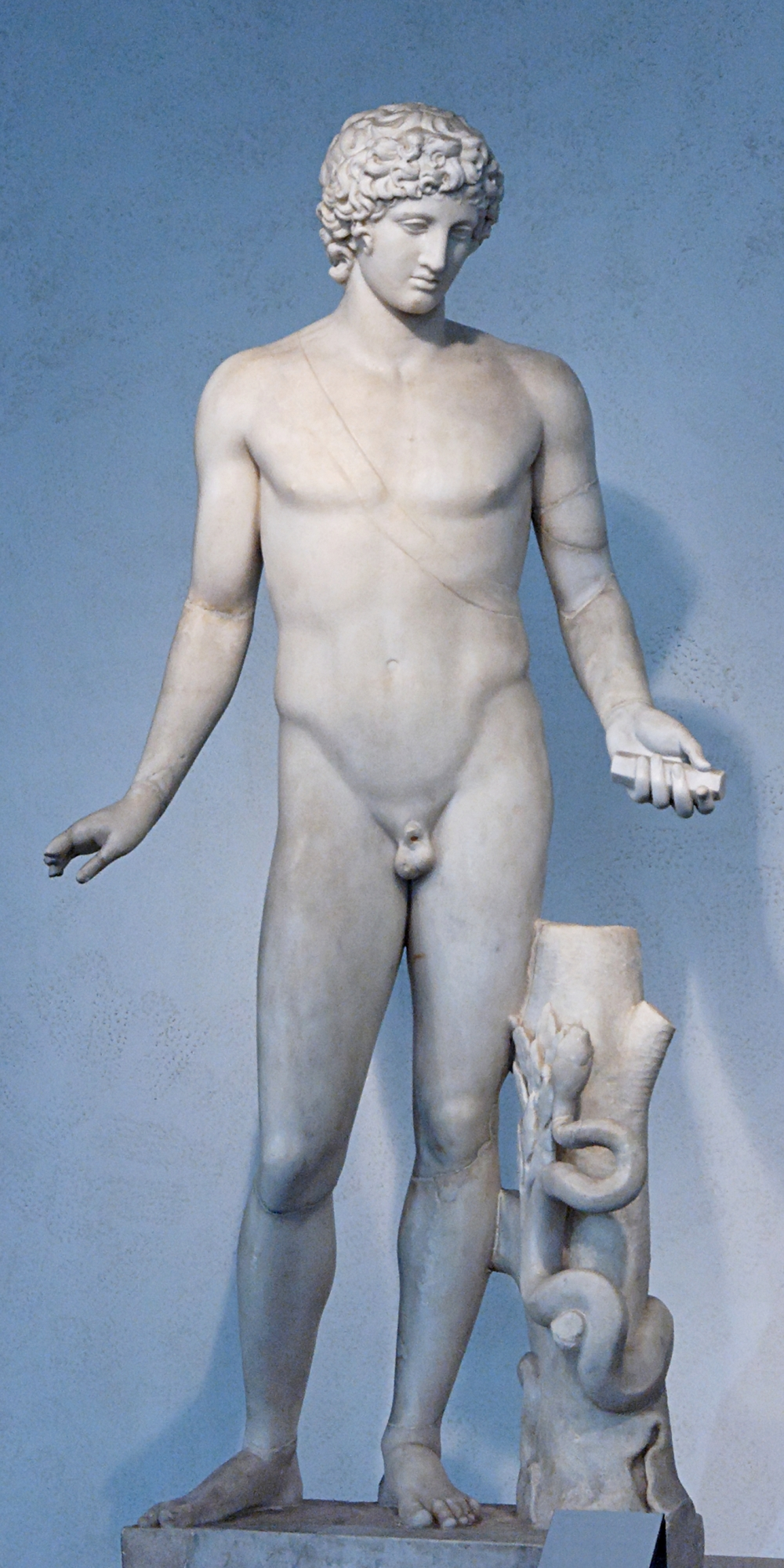
The Apollo of Castelporziano (white marble; height 170 cm; inv. 75,675)

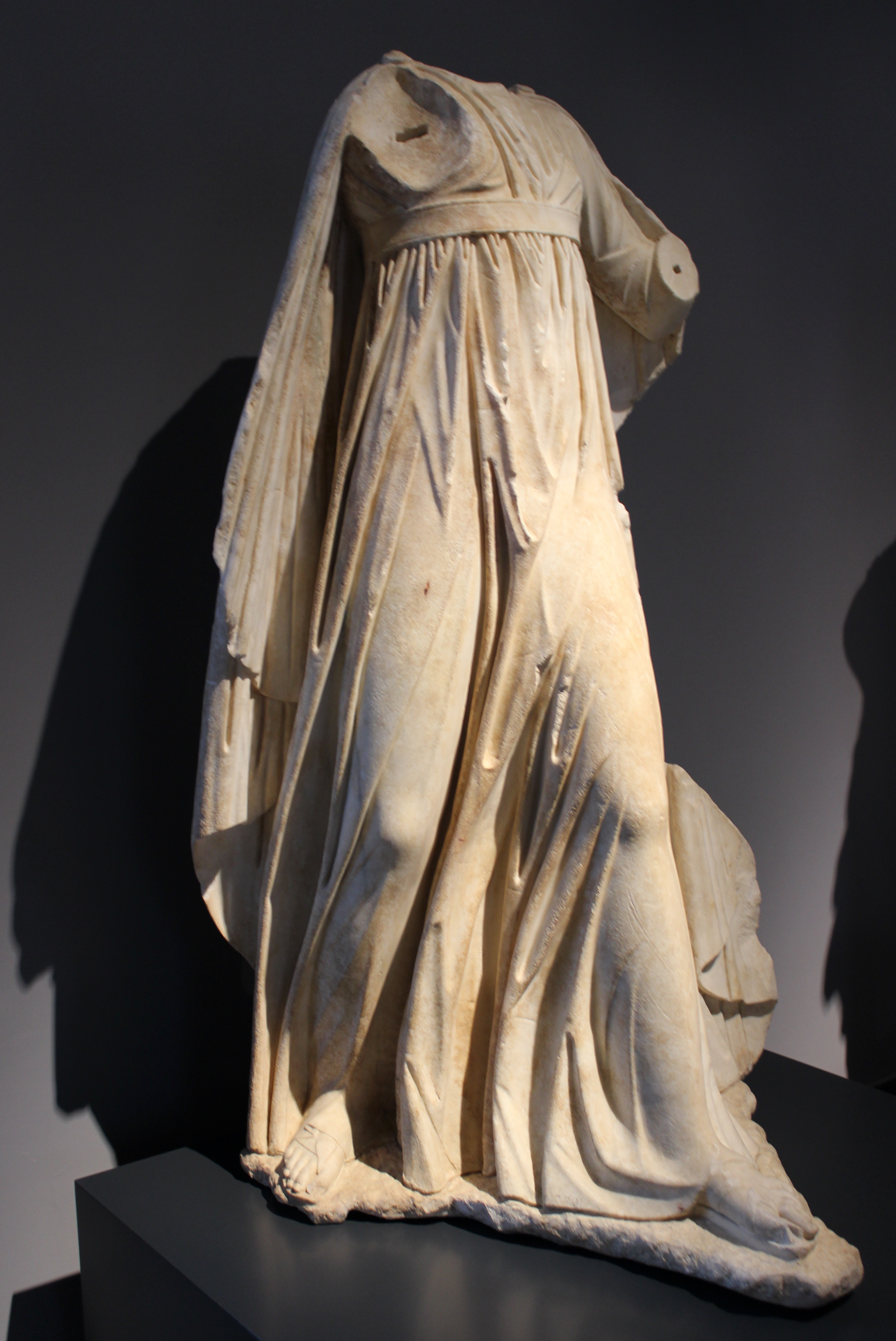
A citharist Apollo from the Villa of the Quintili

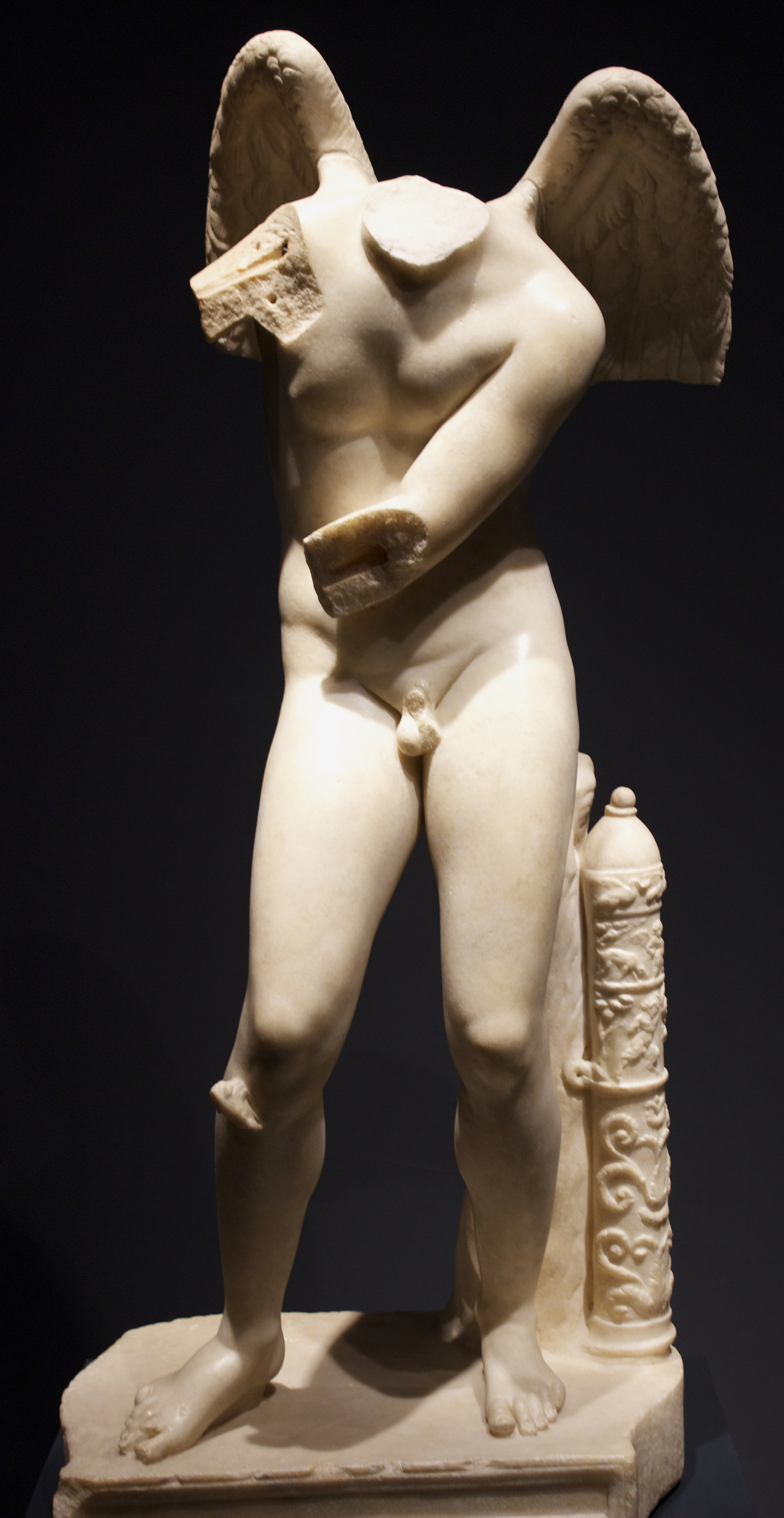
Eros archer by Lysippos (height 120 cm; inv. 129,185)

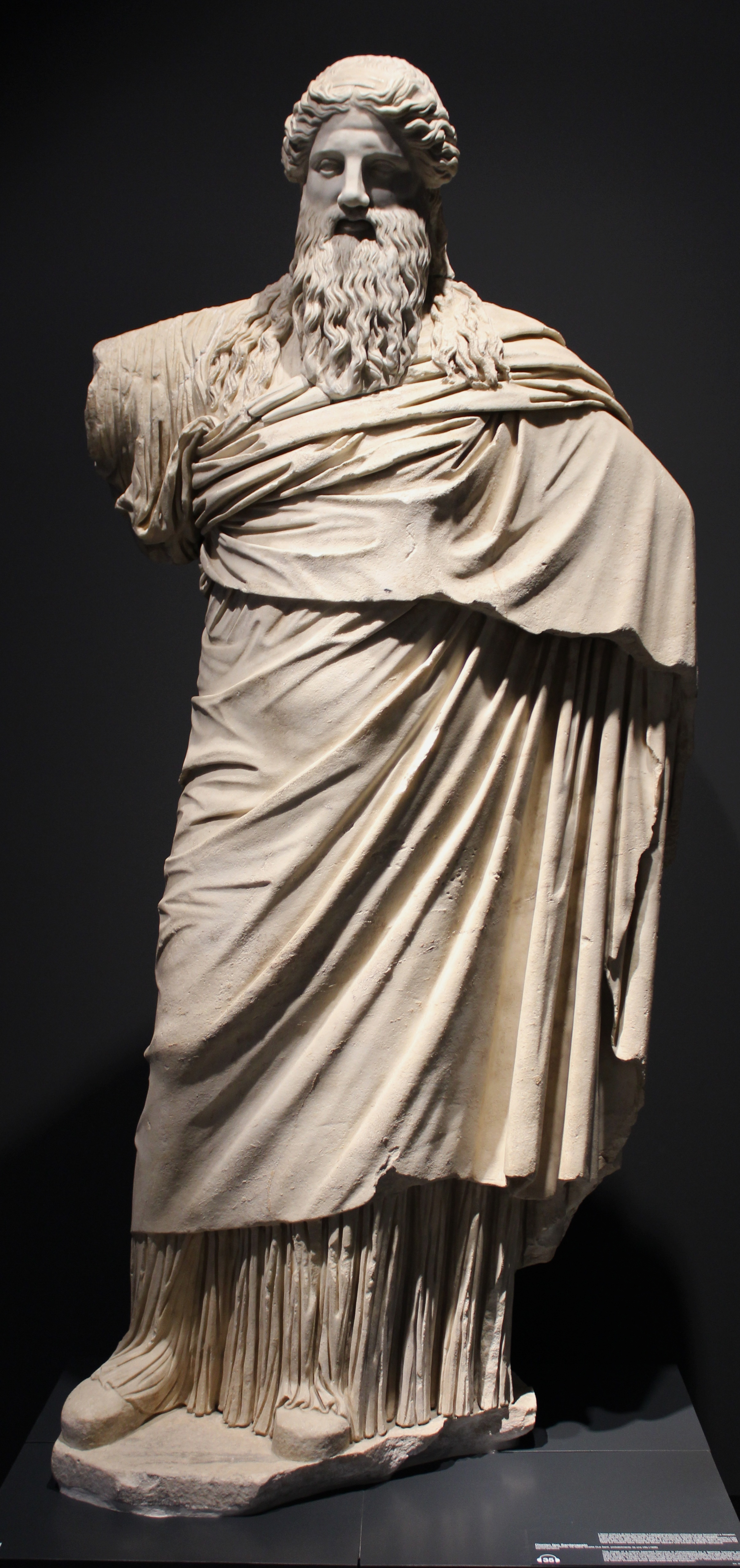
Dionysus Sardanapalus

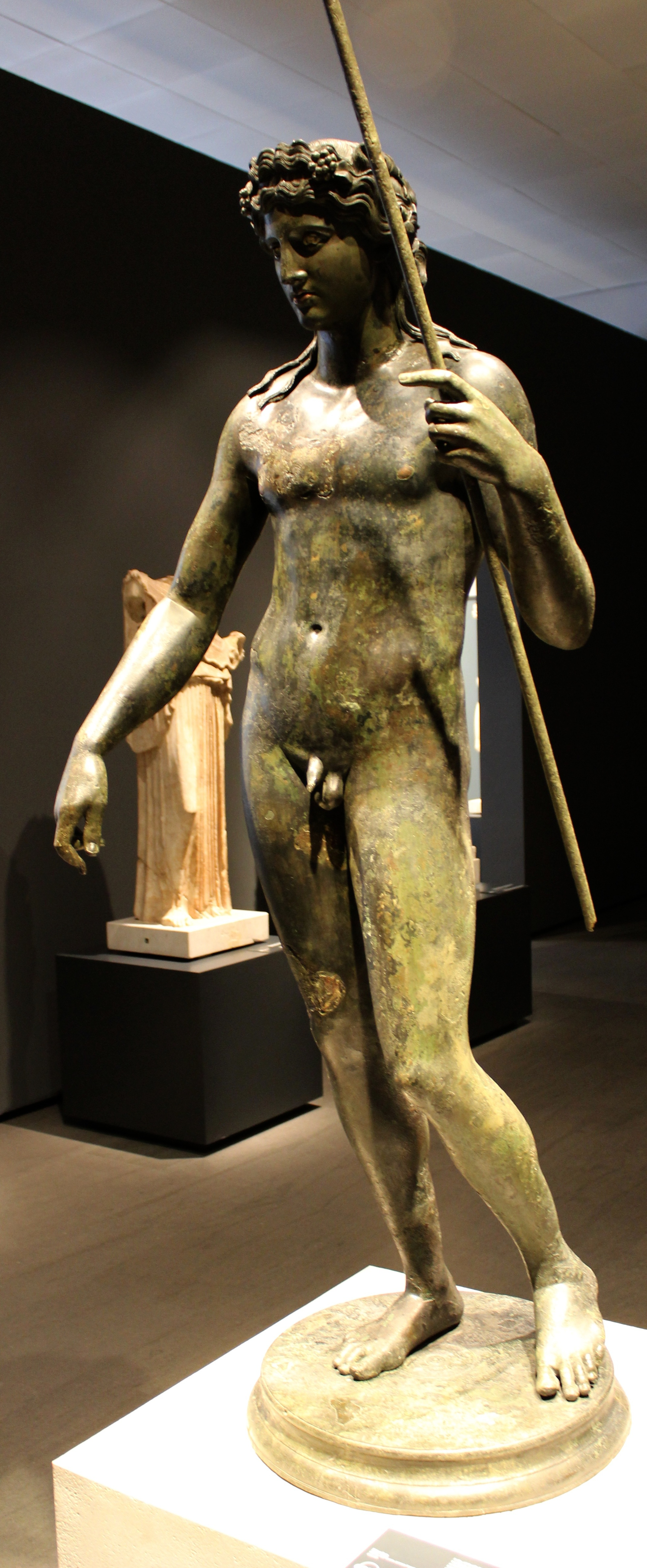
Bronze Dionysus (from the Tiber riverbed; height 158 cm; inv. 1.060)

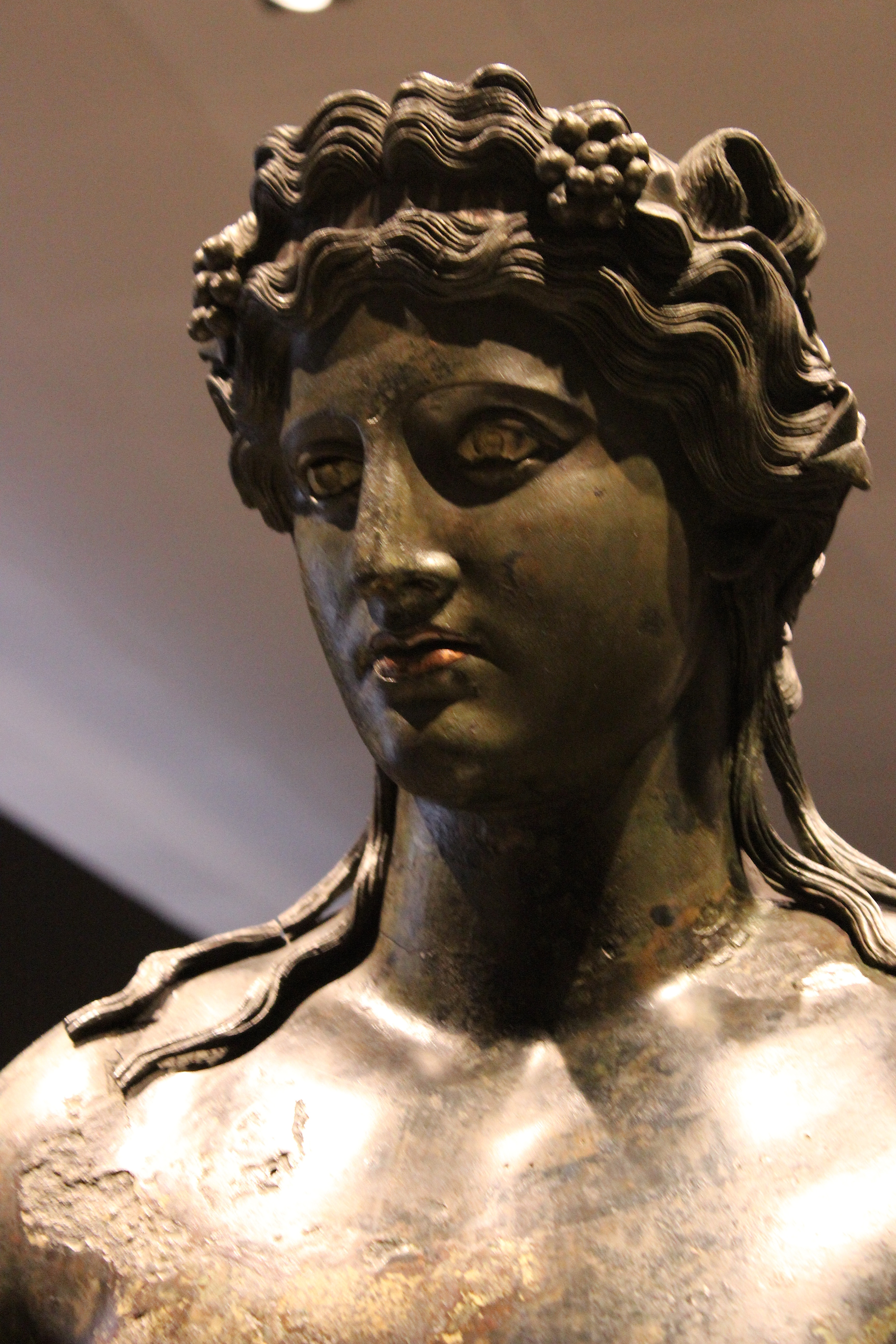
Detail of the face of the bronze Dionysus

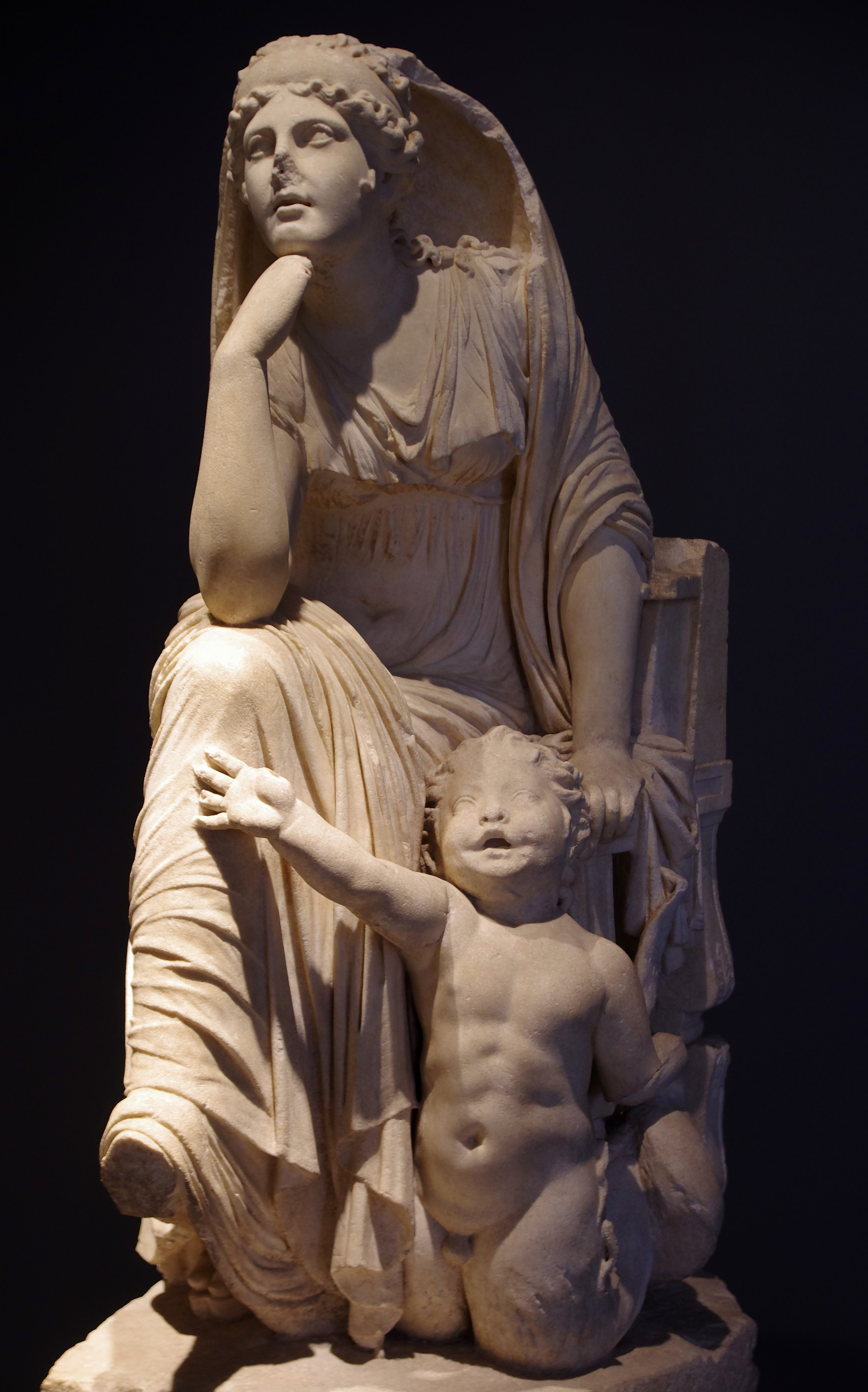
Statue of Thetis with a triton (Roman copy from a 2nd-century BC Greek original)

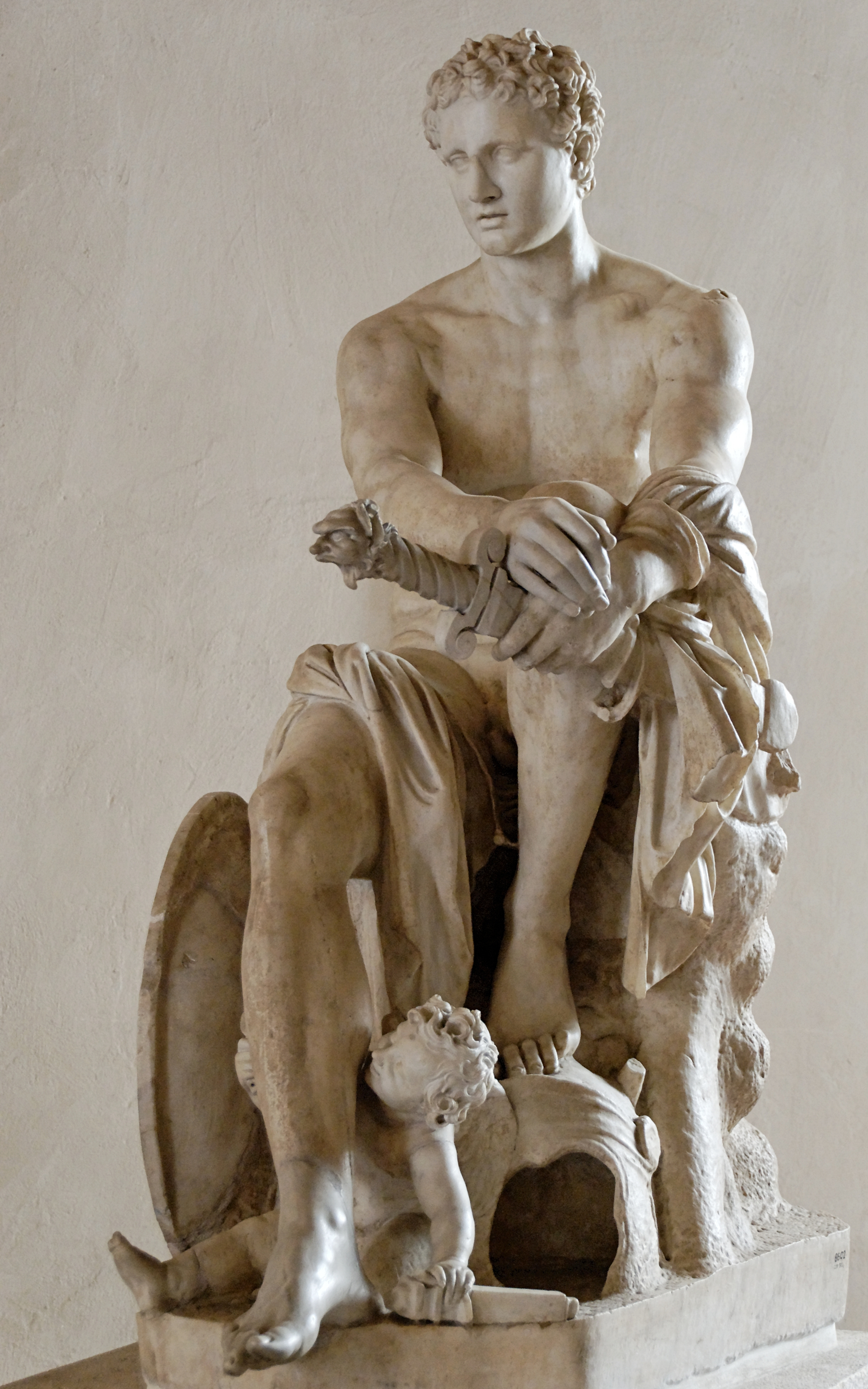
The so-called "Ares Ludovisi" (now in Palazzo Altemps), which may represent Achilles and be part of the sculptural group along with Thetis

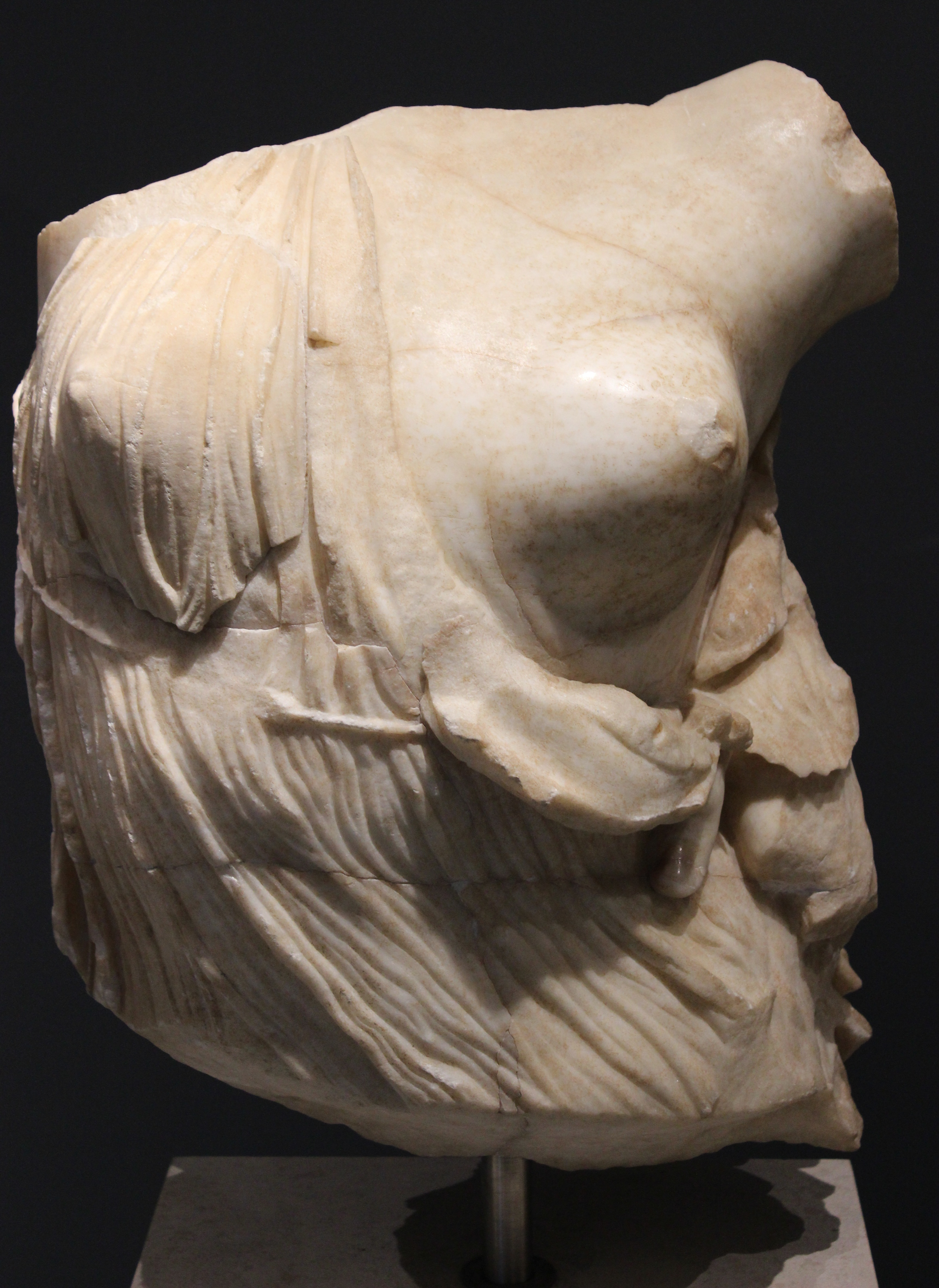
Penthesilea, figure in Greek mythology, daughter of Ares and Otrera, and sister of Hippolyta, Antiope and Melanippe.

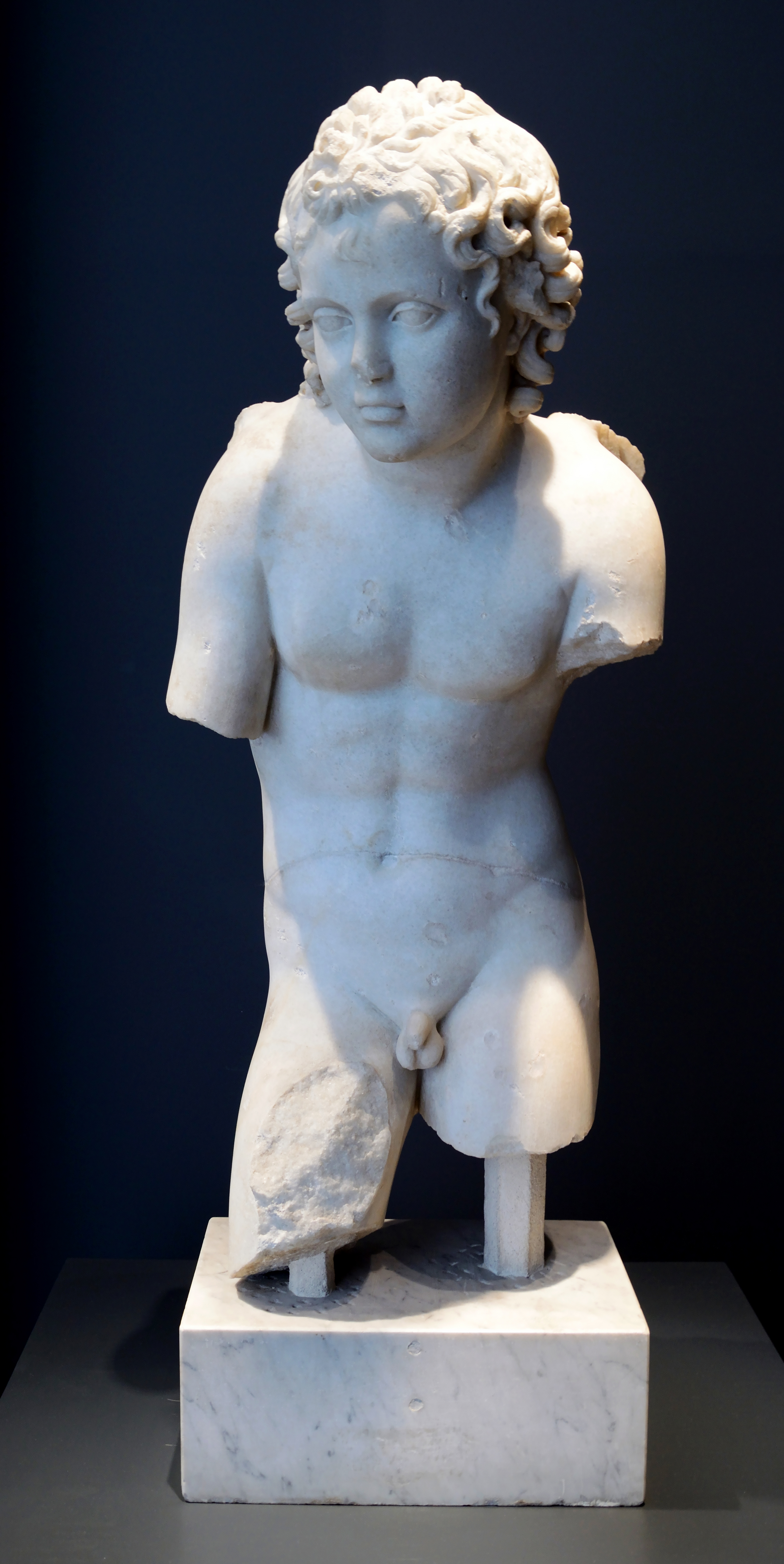
Eros archer (from Lungotevere in Sassia; 2nd-century AD Roman copy from Greek original by Lysippos)

=== Room VIII (first floor) ===
In "Room VIII" the dominant theme is that of the sculptural representation of important mythological groups that were used as exempla virtutis in the furnishings. In this room are examples such as: a head of Heracles from Nemi, a torso of Minotaur (found in Rome together with a male one, possibly belonging to Theseus), a torso of Odysseus (part of a group in which there is the Greek hero, together with Diomedes, after having taken the Palladium from Troy), as well as a statue of the Pedagogue together with the younger sons of Niobe.

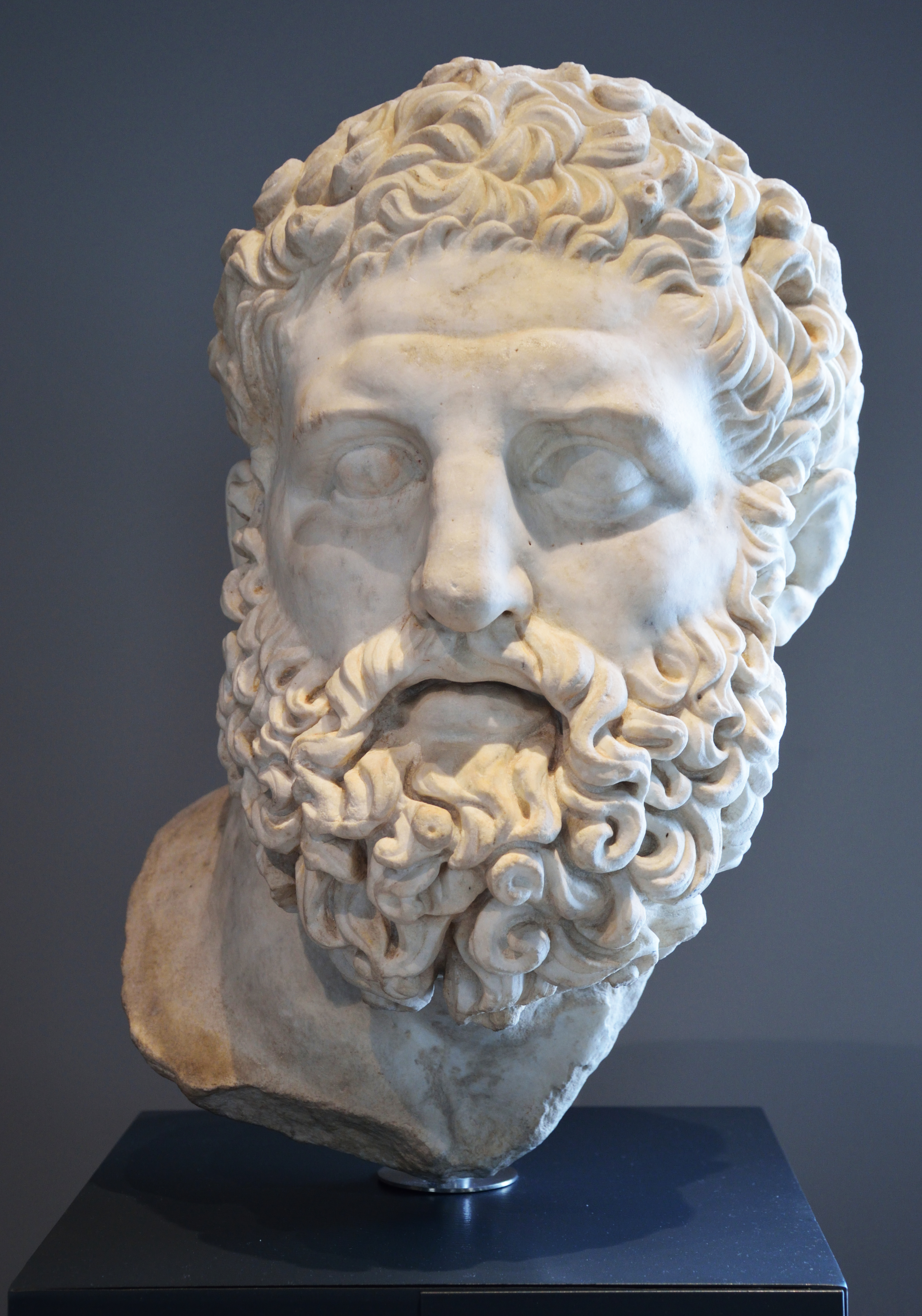
Portrait of Hercules (late 2nd century AD; ancient theater at Nemi)

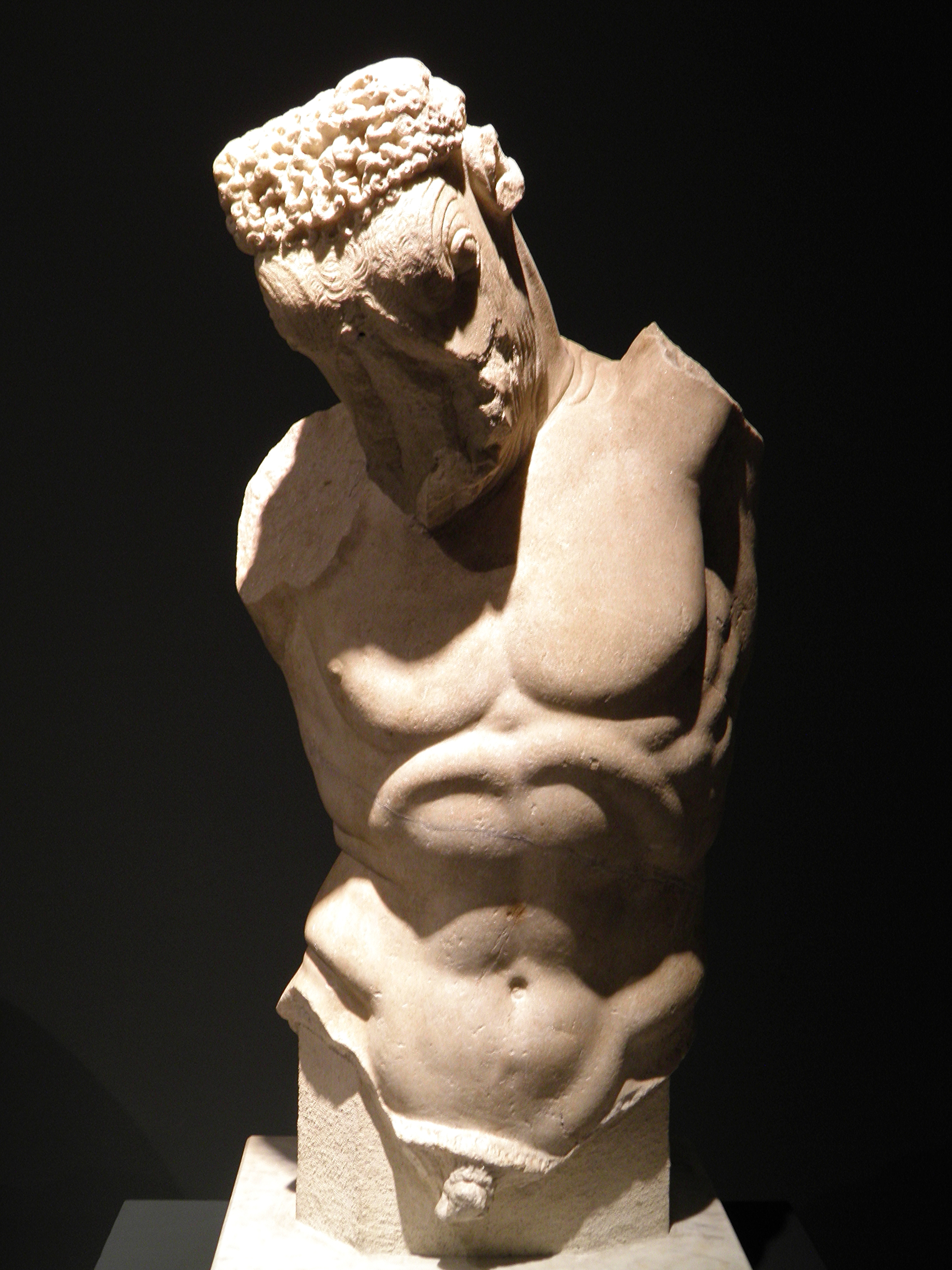
Minotaur Torso

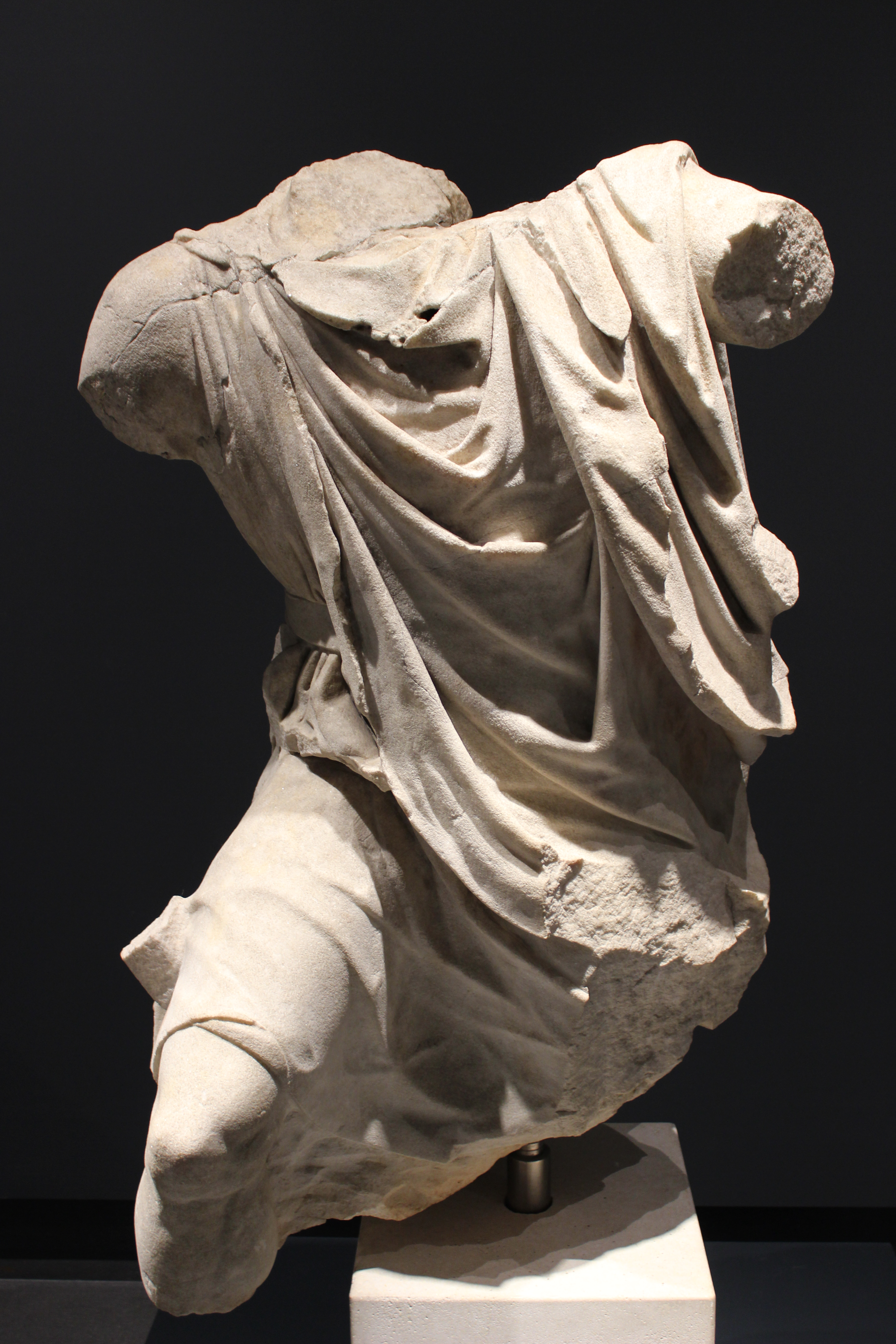
Pedagogue Torso

=== Room IX (first floor) ===
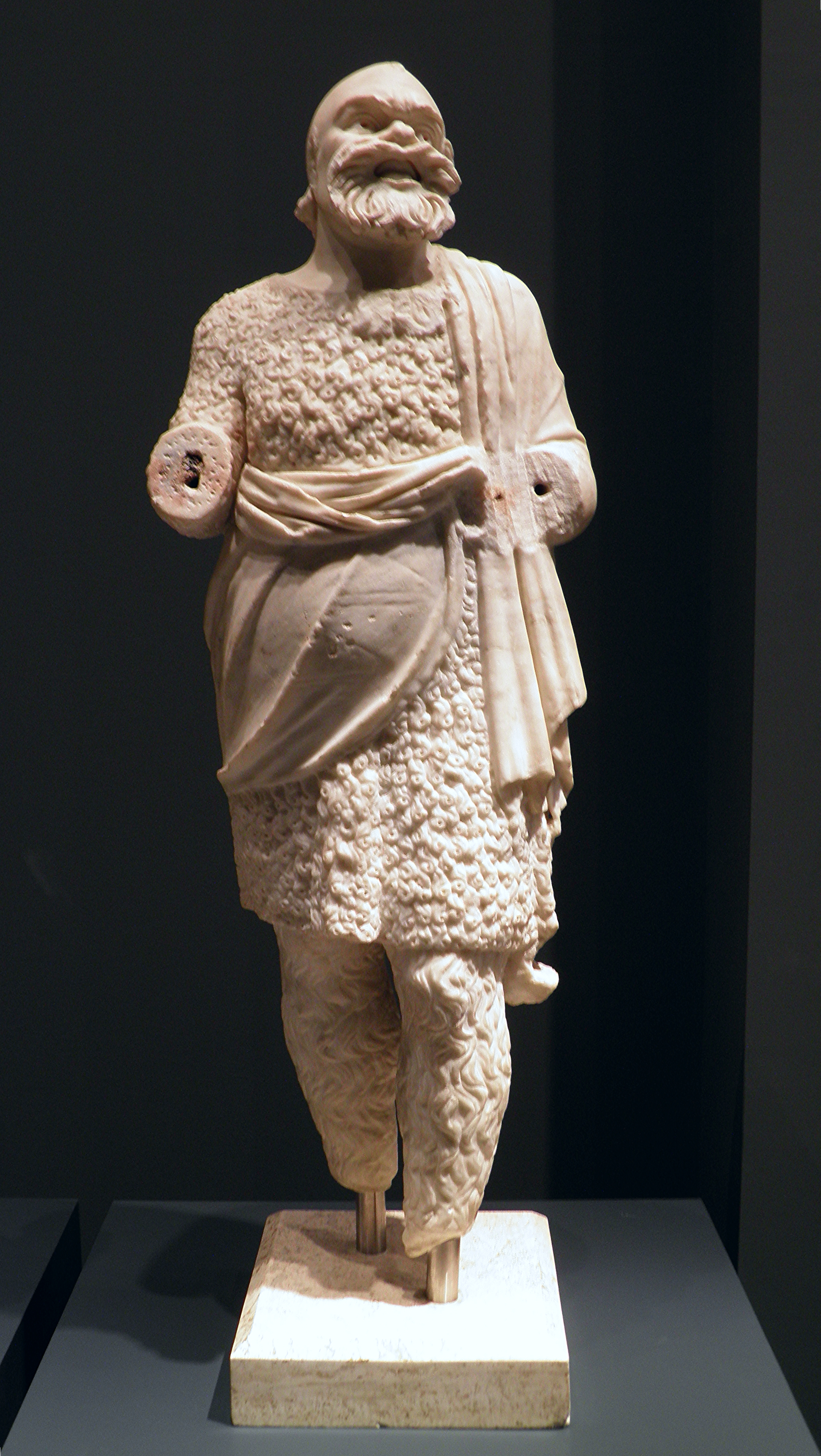
The figure of Papposilenus, who was master of a young Dionysus and played the role of a satyr in the tragedy. He is represented here wearing a theater mask, a dress simulating a lamb's cloak, and wearing hairy tights. This statuette belonged to the sculptural decorations of the villa at Torre Astura.

On display in "Room IX" are a series of busts, statues representing the love of theater. These are sculptures of "theatrical" deities, such as herms representing Hermes and Dionysus, or Homer and Menander, and theatrical masks. One example comes from the villa at Torre Astura, whose statue represents an actor masquerading as Papposilenus, the father of the Satyrs, a guide in the theater (in satirical drama). The costume worn consists of a mask, hairy tights, a chlamys, and a chiton with sleeves made of lamb's hair.

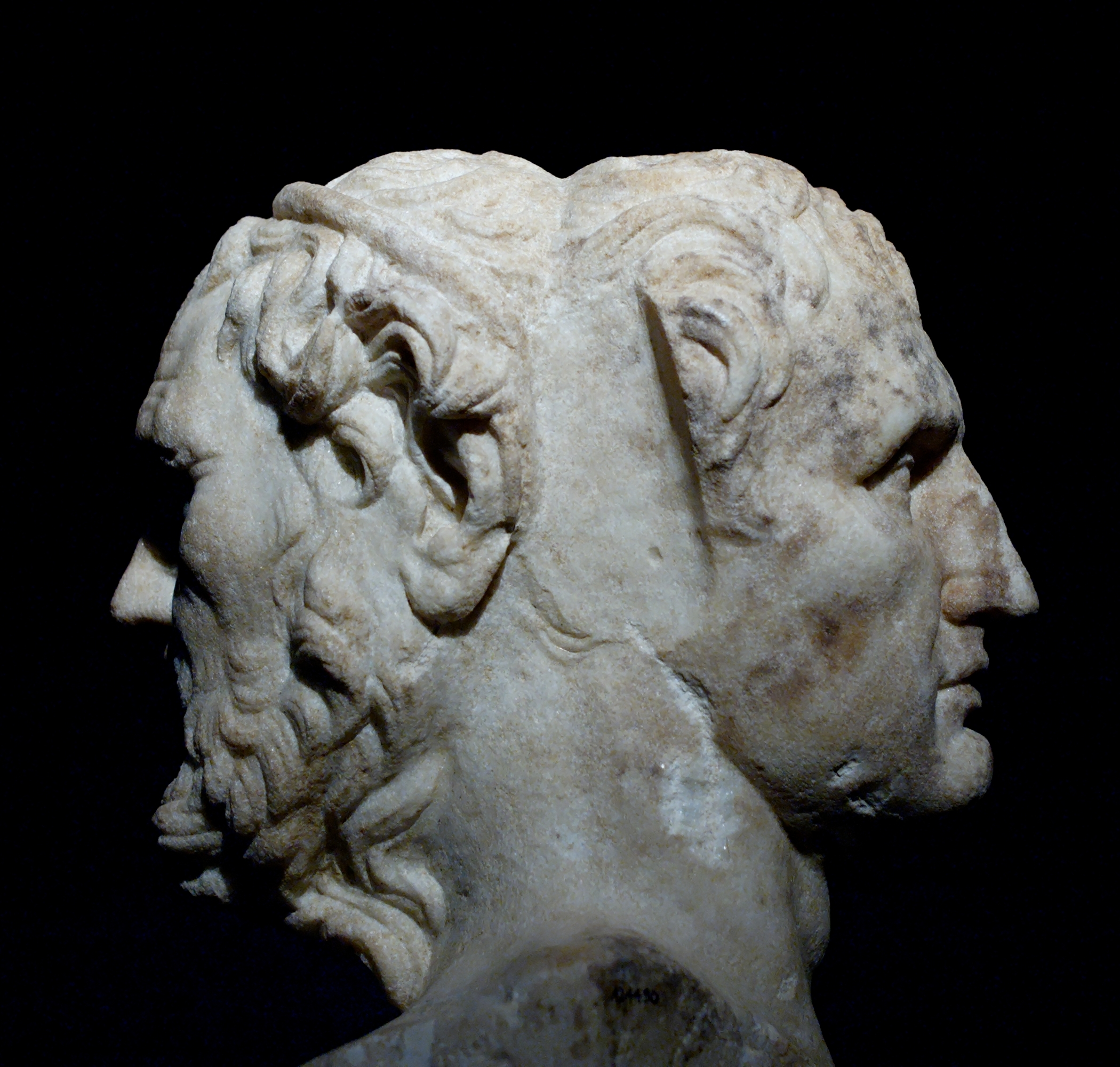
Herm of Homer and Menander (Pentelic marble; Roman copy from the age of Nero or Flavia from a Hellenistic original; found in the Barbuta area of Rome).

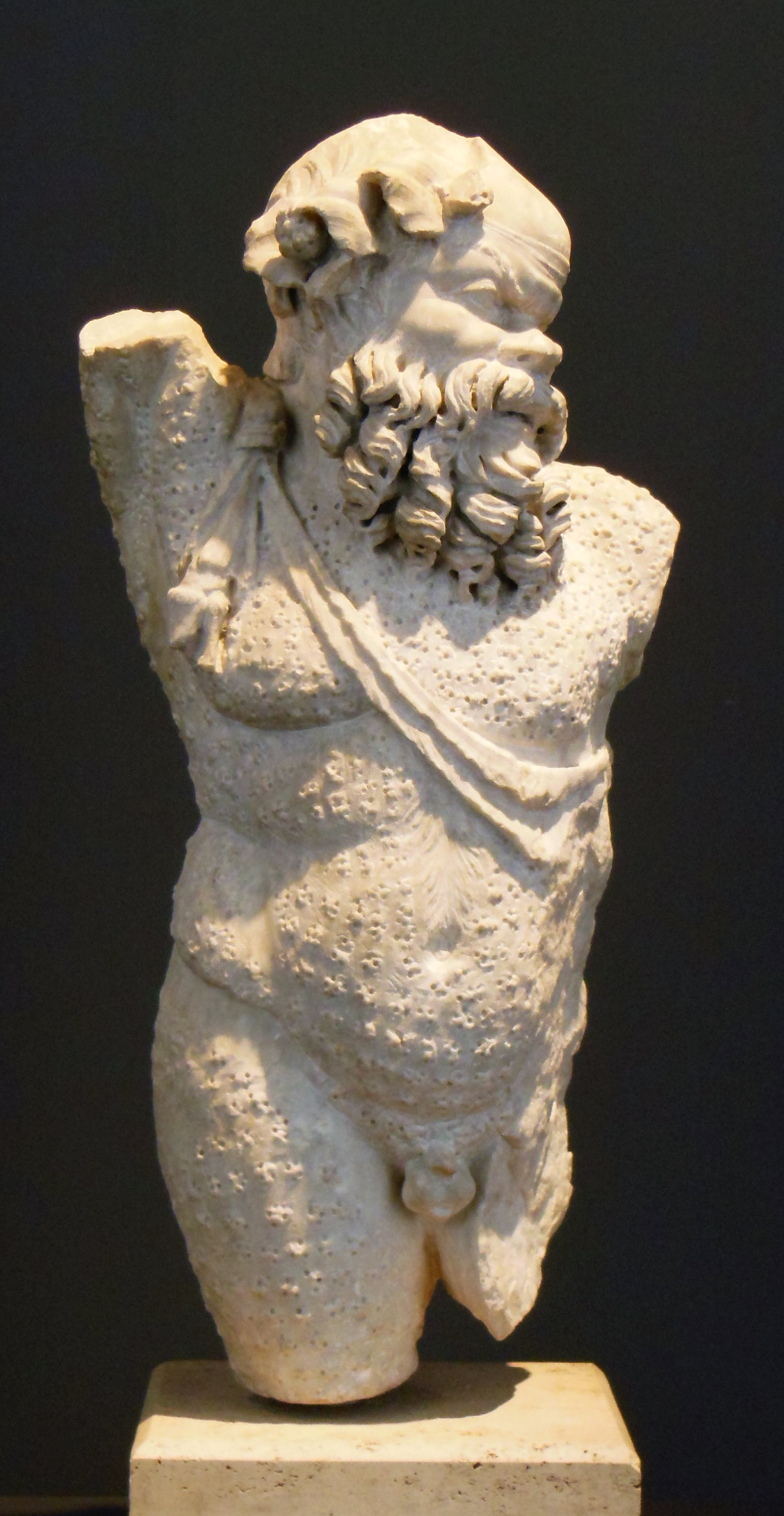
Papposilenus from Via Flavia (villa Spithoever), 1906. Luna marble. Roman copy of 2nd century AD from Hellenistic original of 2nd century BC.

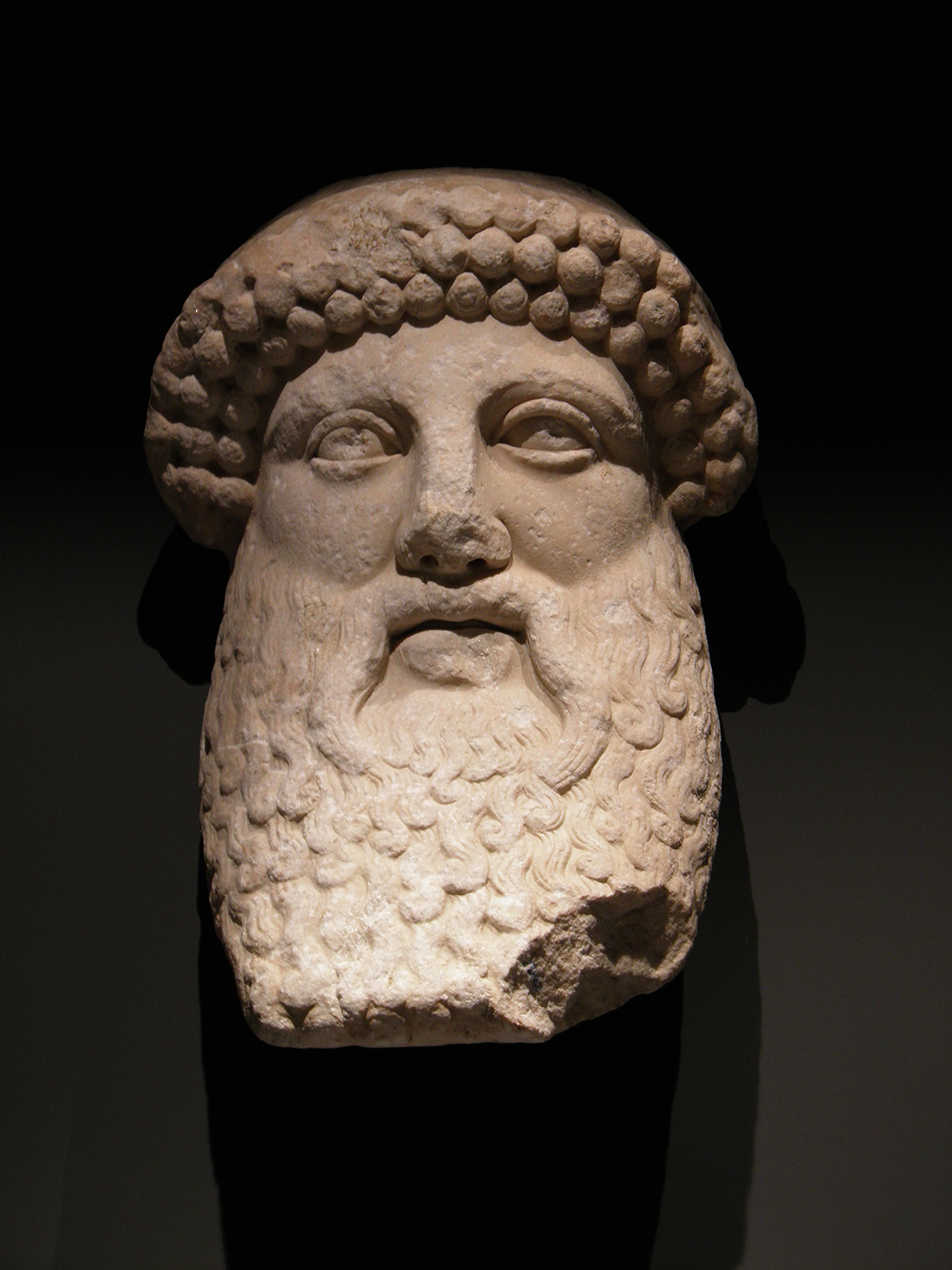
Protome from the Hadrianic period, depicting a mask to adorn theatrical buildings; masks of deities were used as dedications for the Ludi scaenici (theatrical performances).

=== Room X (first floor) ===
In "Room X" are the bronzes of ships that belonged to Emperor Caligula and were found in Lake Nemi. They adorned two large ships found between 1895 and 1932 (71.30 x 20 meters and 73 x 24 meters, respectively), which were destroyed during World War II. They were used for the emperor's feasts and banquets, showing unrestrained pageantry of the time, and were connected to a villa that Caligula had on the lake (formerly belonging to Gaius Julius Caesar), adjoining the Latian shrine of Diana Nemorense (the seat of the Latin League dissolved in 338 BC). The ships echoed the Hellenistic tradition of parade boats, as was the case among the Ptolemies. They had marble and mosaic flooring, were decorated with the bronzes on display, and covered with gilded tiles. Regarding the bronzes that have come down to us: a balustrade supported by small pillars adorned with Dionysian herms, some animal heads (four wolves, three lions, and a leopard), and a Medusa. Other finds have been dispersed among private collections and foreign museums.

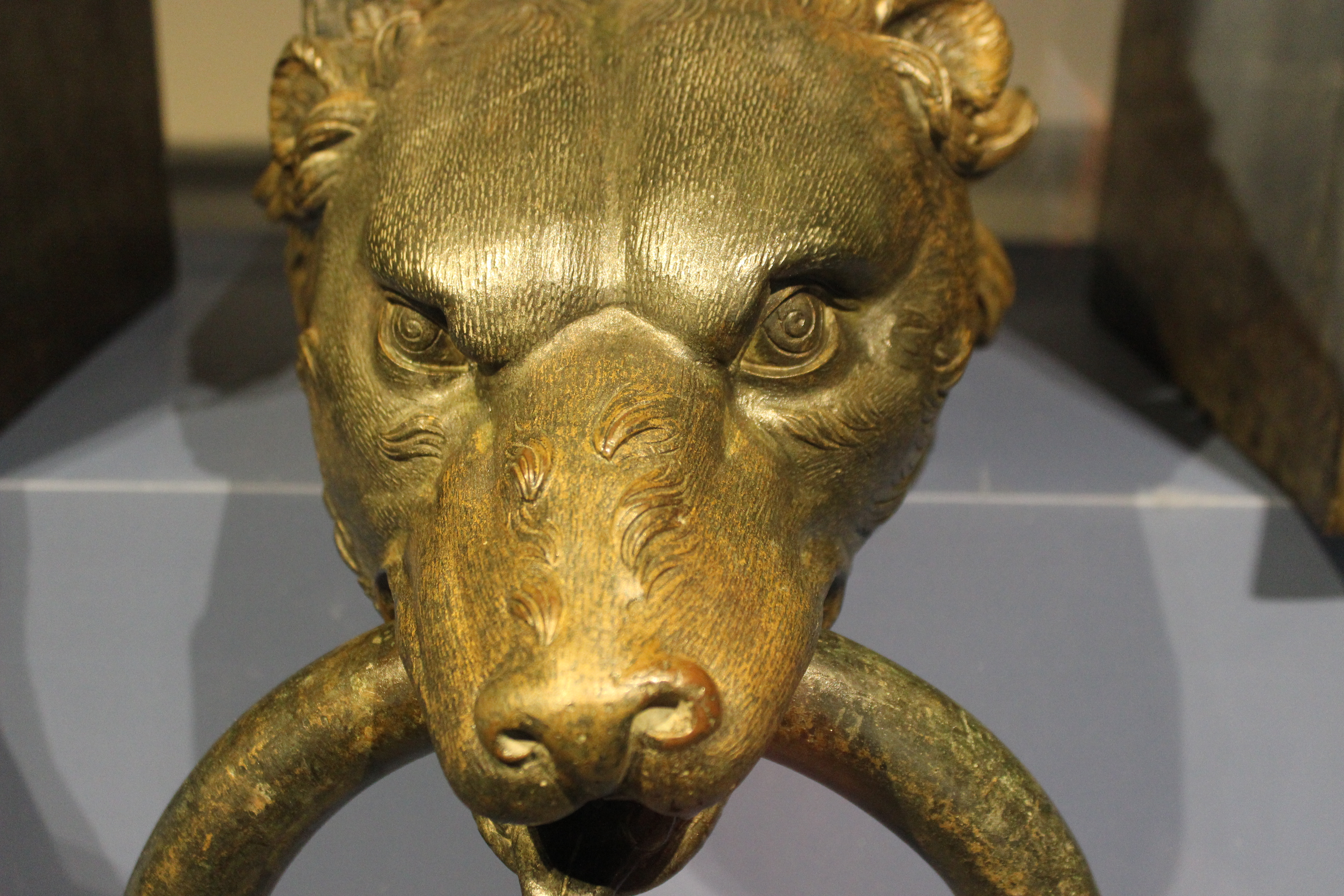
Wolf-shaped bronze from the Nemi ships; Caligula era, 37-41 AD.

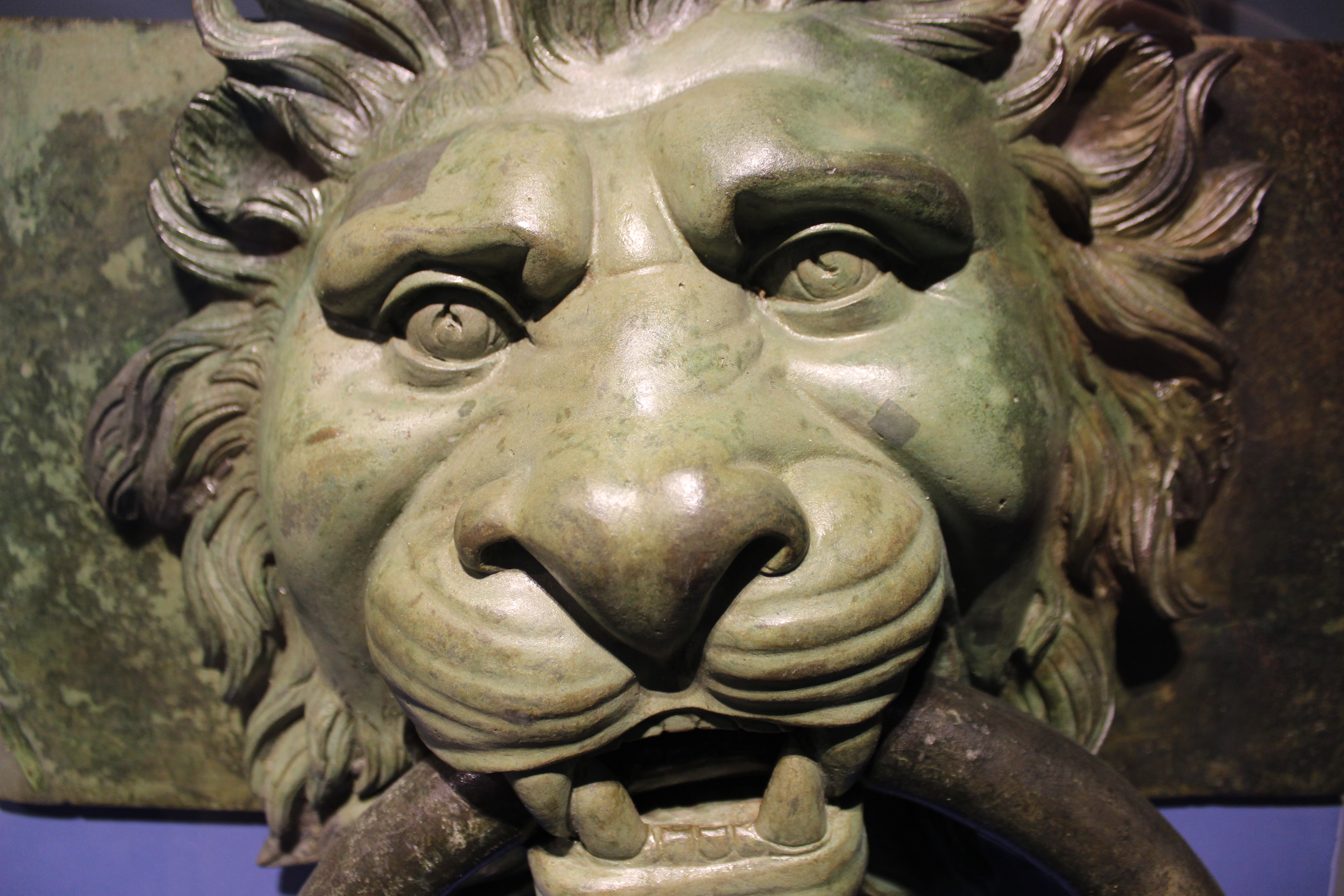
Lion-shaped bronze (Nemi ships)

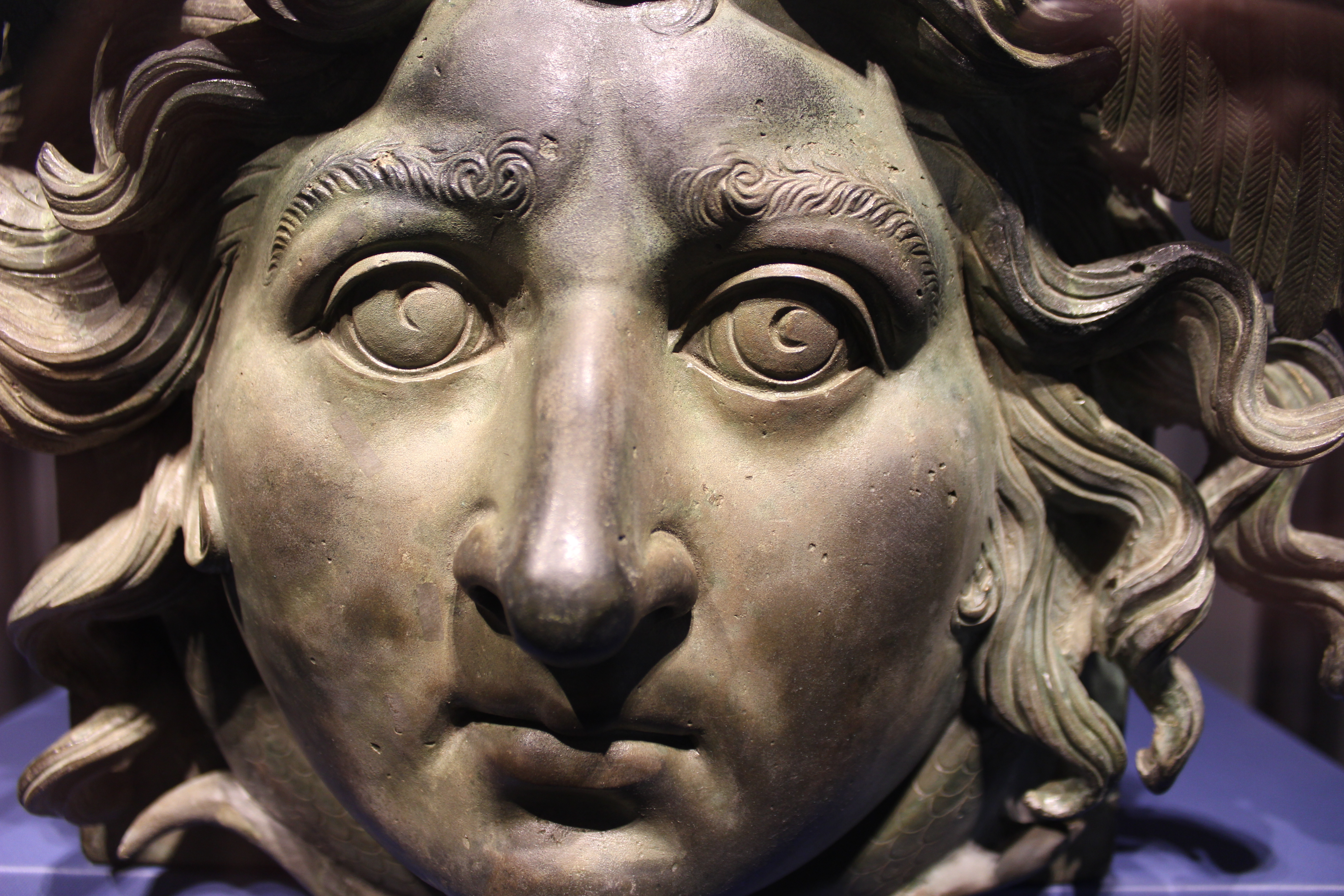
Bronze in the shape of a medusa (Nemi ships; found in 1895)

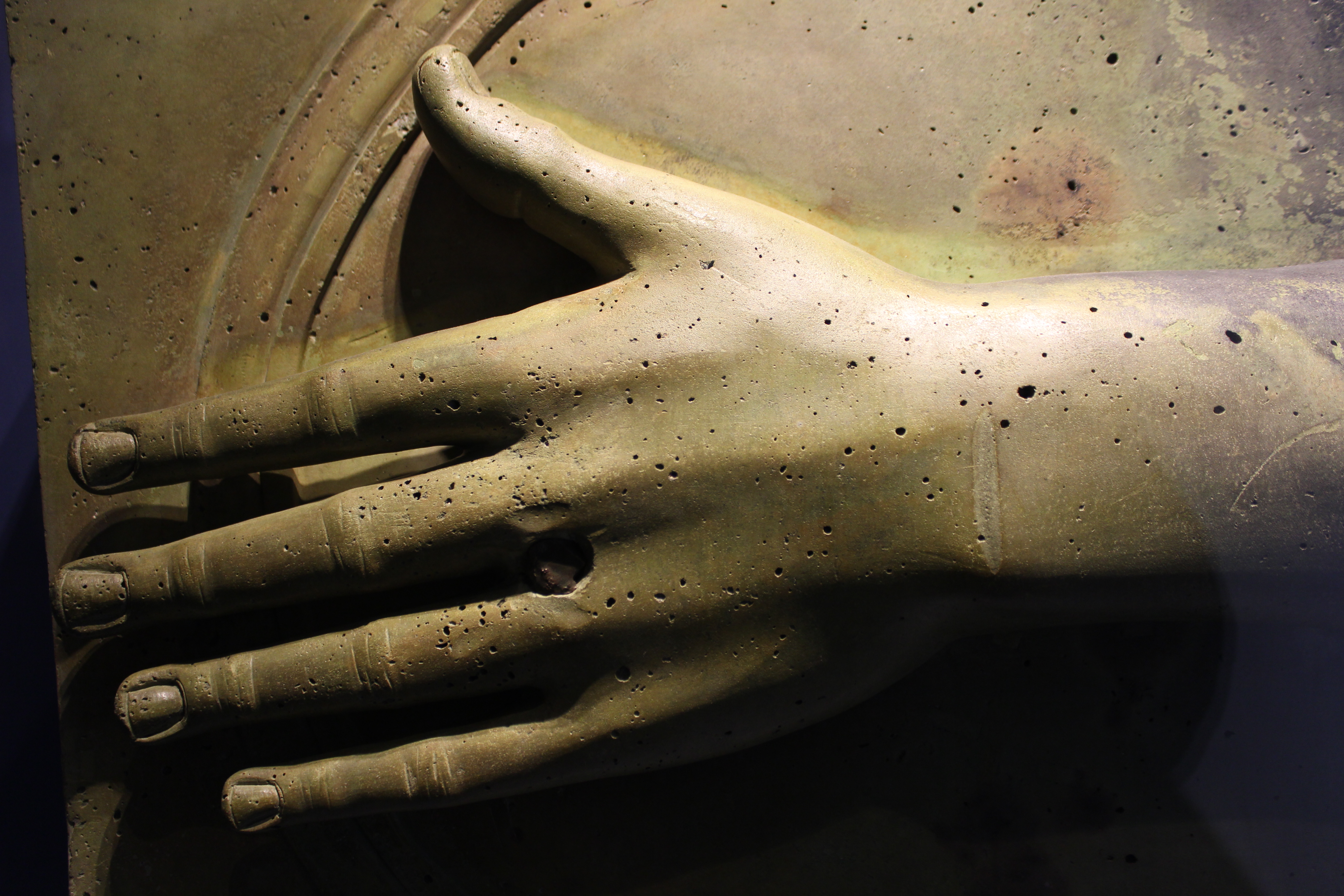
Bronze in the shape of a hand (Nemi ships)

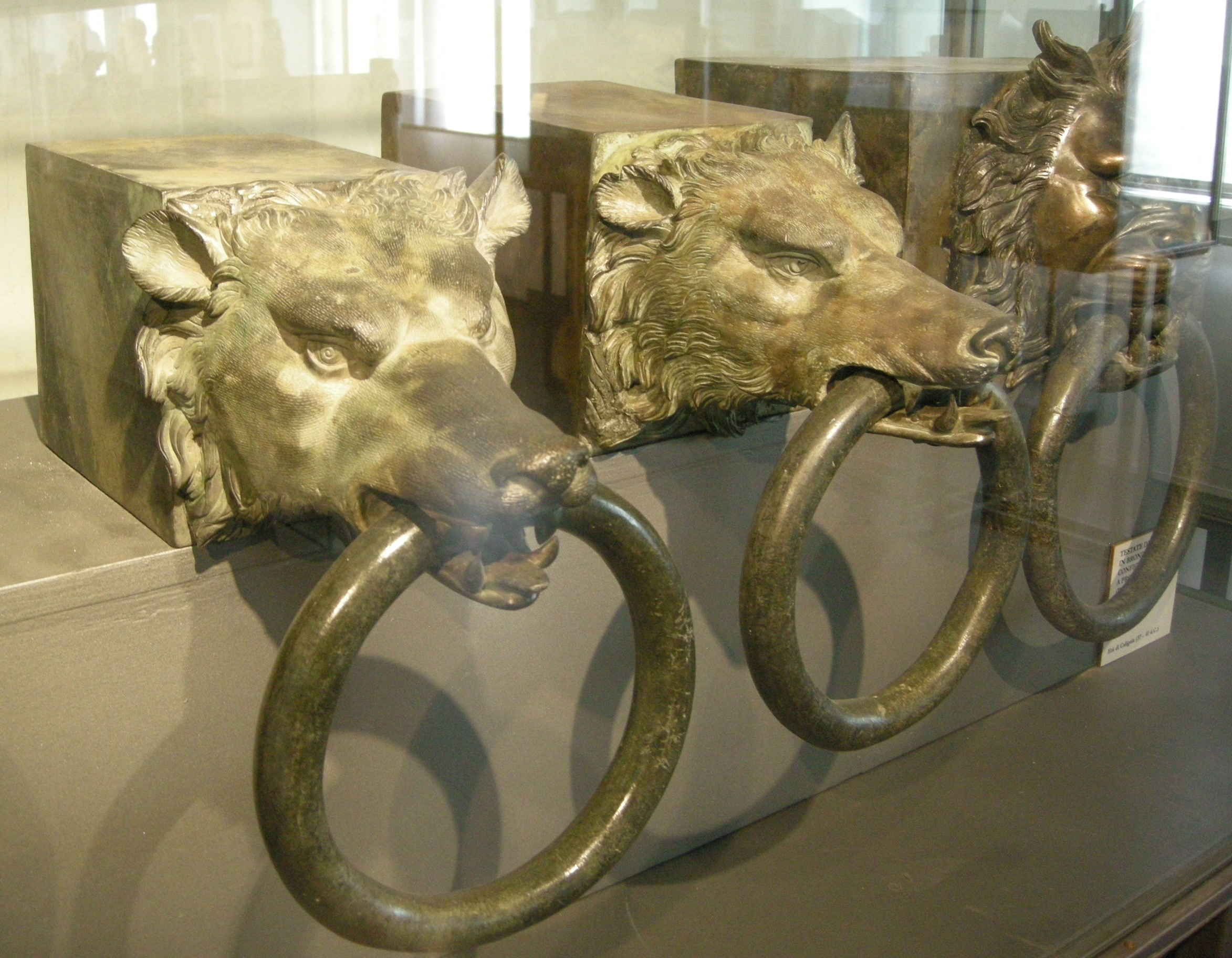
Bronzes in the shape of heads of various animals from the ships of Nemi

=== Room XI (first floor) ===
In "Room XI" there is a Domitian-era relief depicting a decastyle temple with the pediment decorated with an episode from Roman mythology: the Lupercal and Rhea Silvia. This relief looks like it may belong to the same fragment with a scene of a procession of togates now preserved in the Vatican Museums.

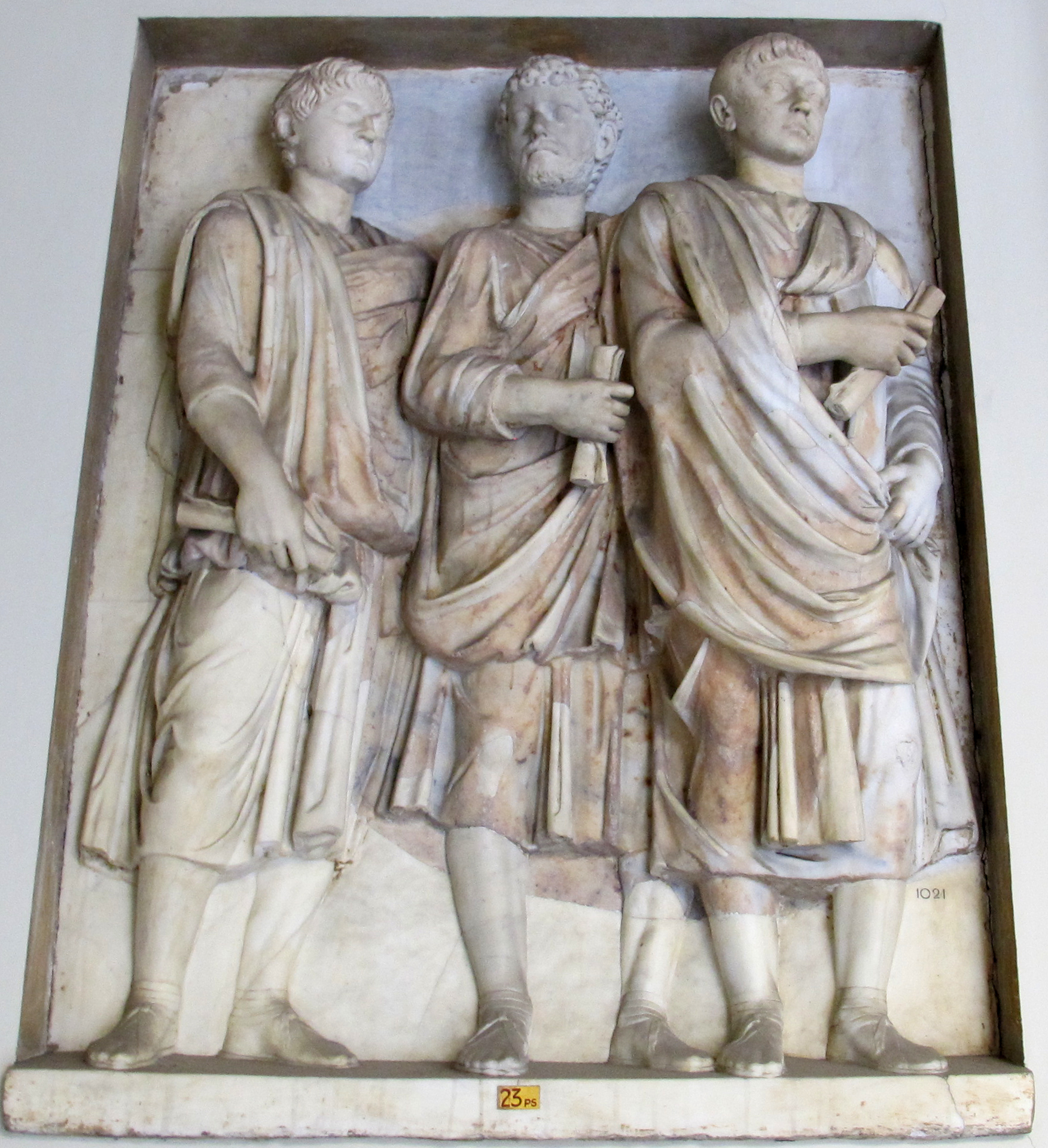
Procession of togates (Vatican Museums)

Since the Flavian era and then throughout the second century CE until the Antonine dynasty, one of the main themes of Roman art were the victories achieved by its generals over barbarian nations along the imperial borders (limes). Thus developed in this period a series of historical reliefs celebrating the military campaigns of the emperors both in the public sphere, from triumphal arches, columns (such as the Trajan's Column and that of Marcus Aurelius) and temples, to private (such as funerary reliefs or sarcophagi). A relief dating to the Flavian or Trajan age is preserved, in which three Roman legionaries advance through a reedbed, probably engaged in a military campaign. In another relief there is a barbarian and remains of other figures (from the Campus Martius), datable to the first century, which belonged to a frieze celebrating a Roman victory along the northern borders.

=== Room XII (first floor) ===
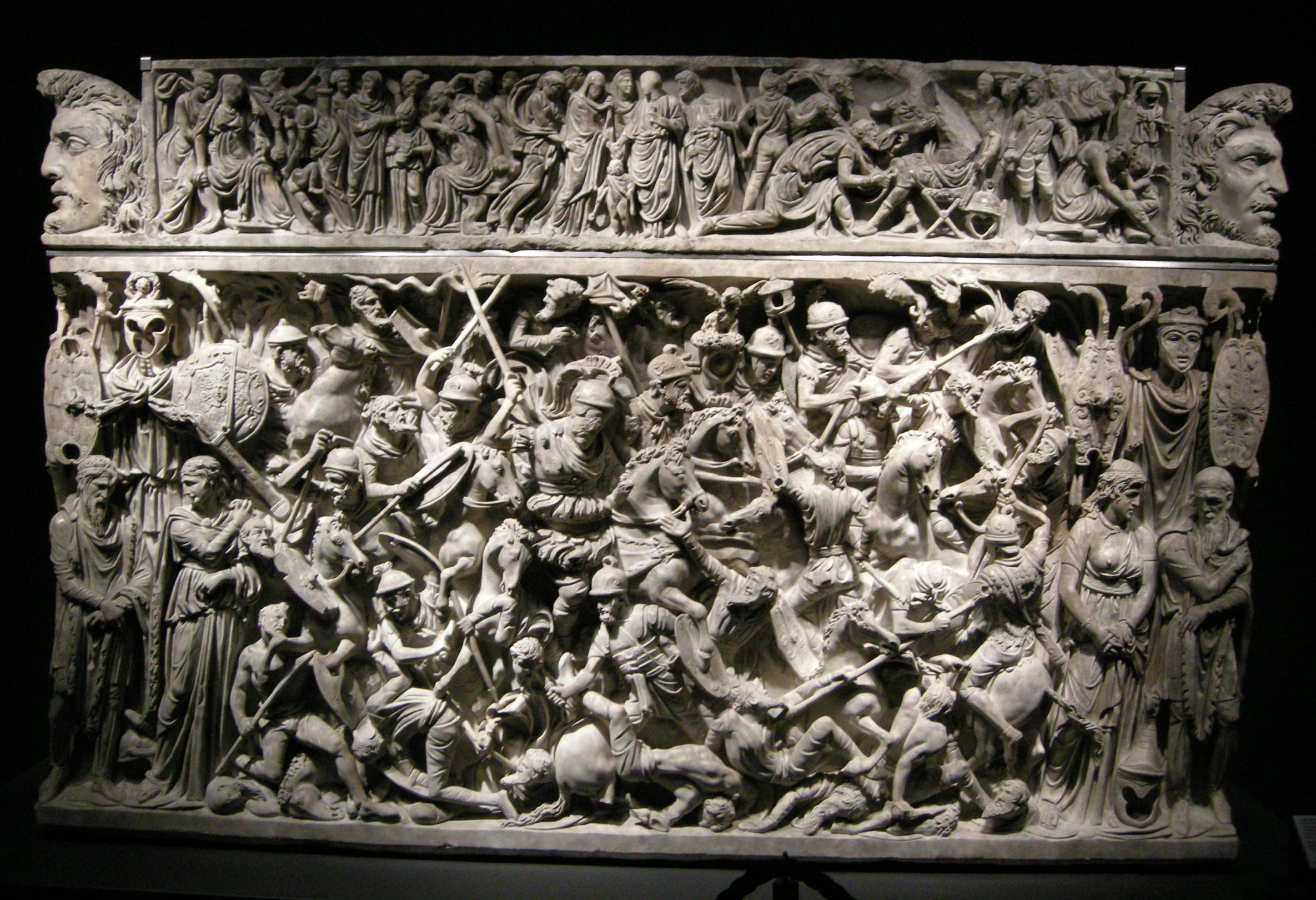
The so-called Portonaccio sarcophagus

"Room XII" was set up for the so-called Portonaccio sarcophagus. This is a Roman sarcophagus found in 1931 in Via delle Cave di Pietralata, near Portonaccio, a neighborhood of Rome along the Via Tiburtina. It can be dated to around c. 180. All the scenes illustrate the virtutes of the deceased (possibly Aulus Julius Pompilius Titus Vivius Laevillus Piso Berenicianus), who stands in the center of the sarcophagus in the act of fighting against the barbarians. On the elevation of the lid, on the other hand, four scenes from the deceased's life are engraved that also celebrate his virtues: the presentation of the newborn to his mother; his education and sapientia (due to the presence of the Muses); marriage and concordia; and the clementia reserved toward the barbarians.

The sarcophagus must have been the tomb of a Roman general engaged in Marcus Aurelius's Germano-Sarmatian campaigns of the years 172-175, and is perhaps the finest example of private sculpture of the second century, with influences related to the trends of the Aurelian Column. The face of the deceased is not elaborated, perhaps because the workshops, after producing the basic sculpture, waited for the buyer to be able to portray him. In the case of Pompilius Berenicianus there may have been a lack of time to portray him or his face was not known to the sculptor. Some modern scholars believe that the illustration of the protagonist's biographical events were summarized in scenes that were valid for anyone.

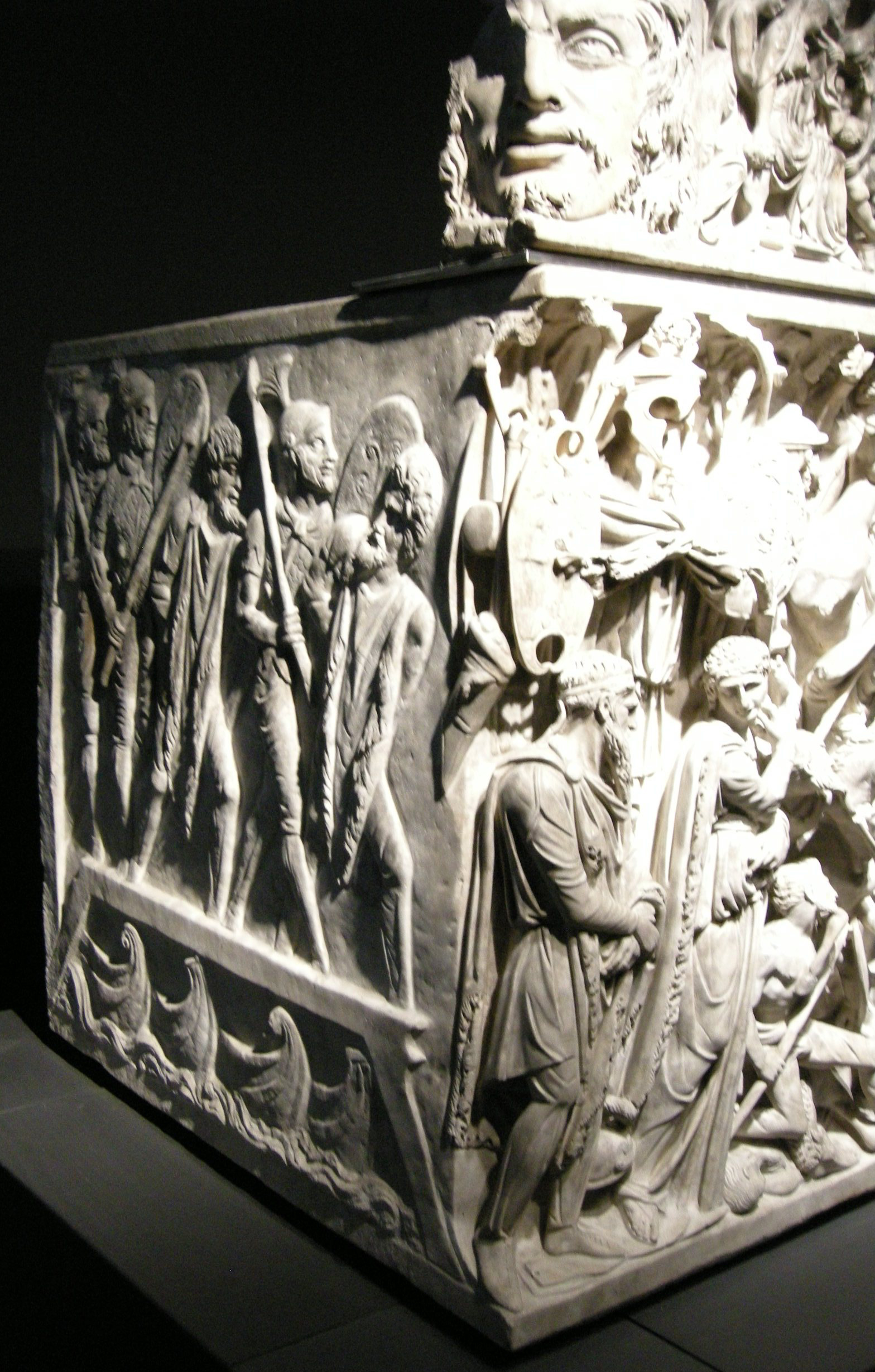
Roman soldiers escort two barbarian prisoners

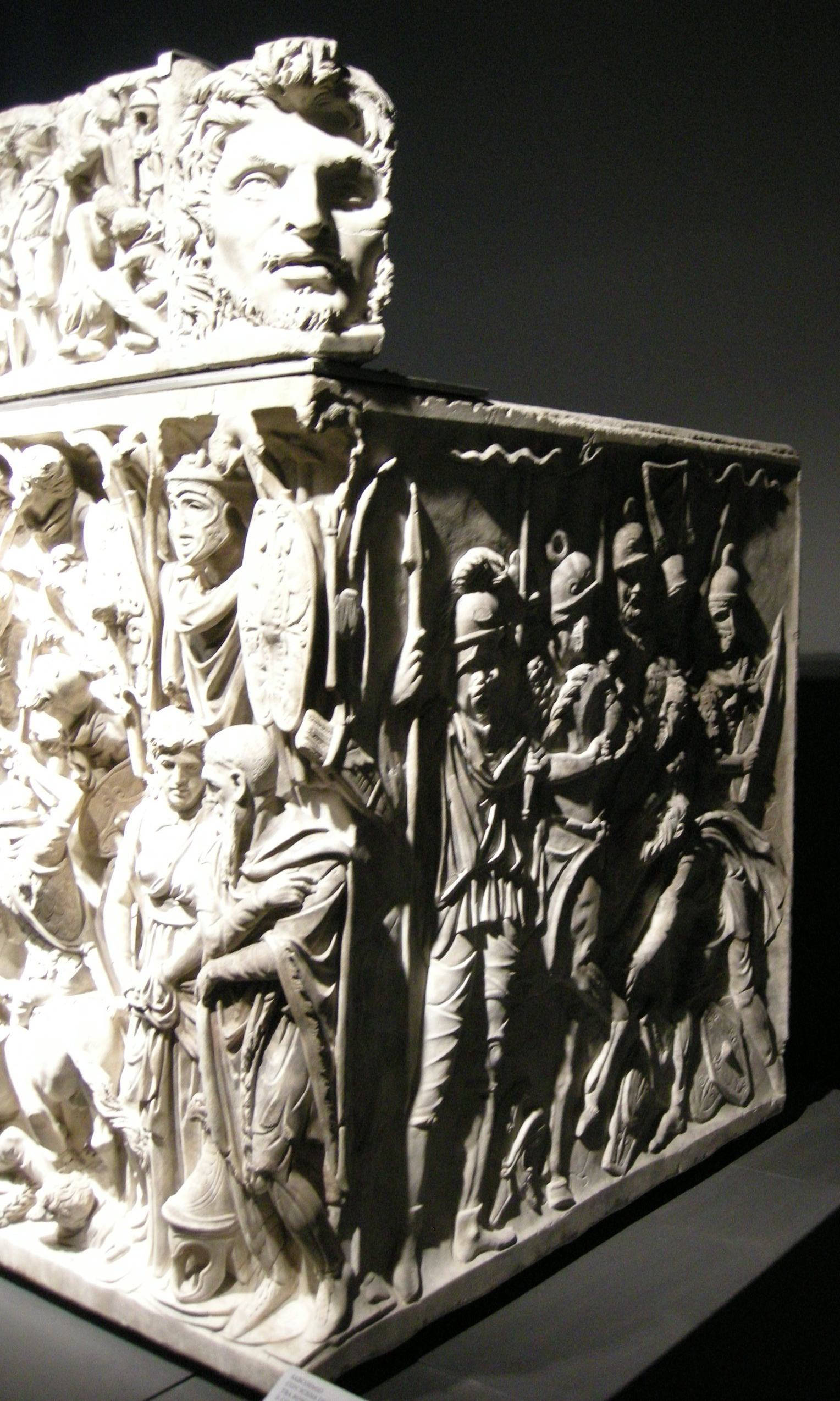
Two barbarians prostrate themselves before the Roman commander, probably the deceased

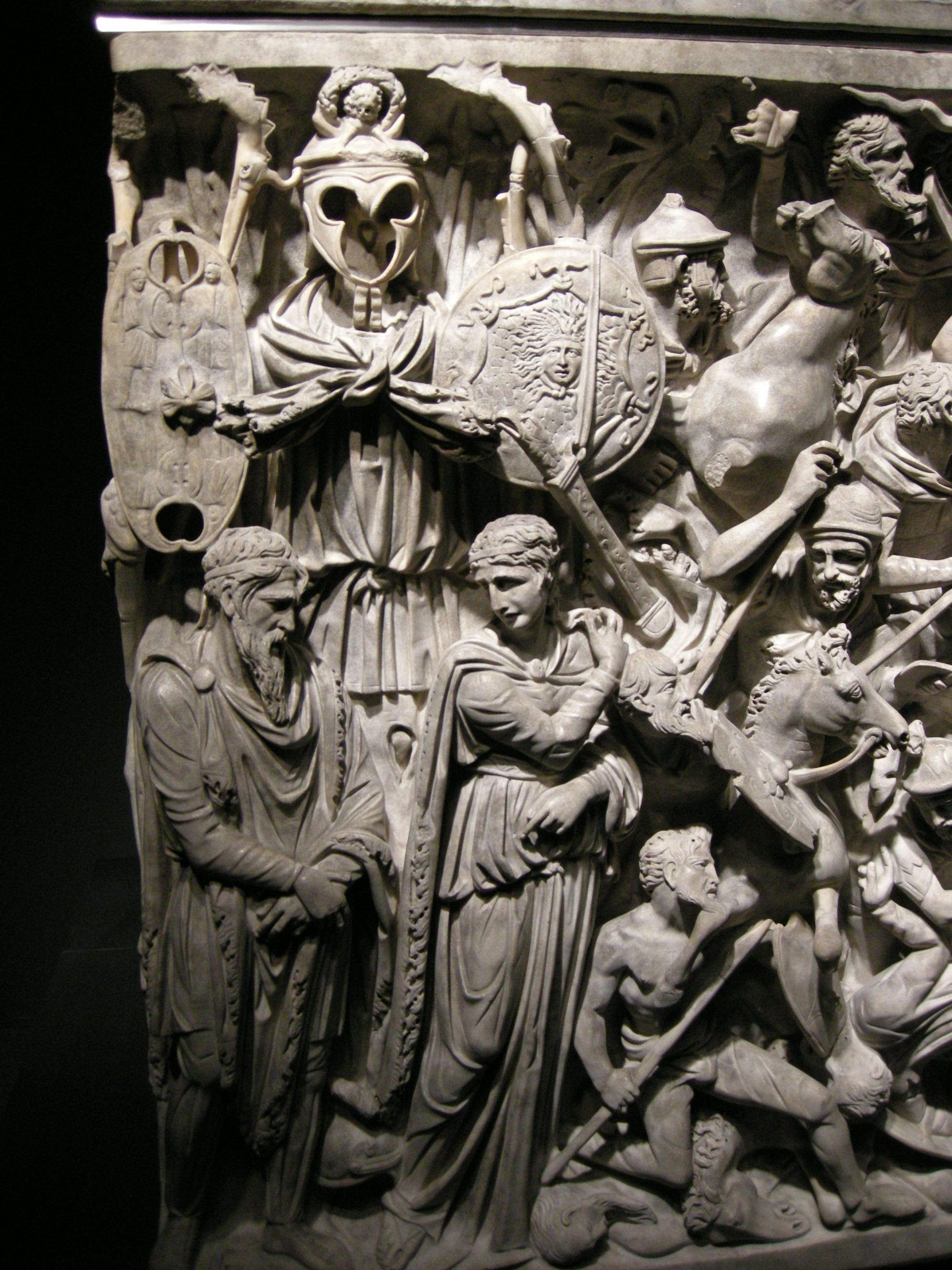
Detail of the front-left side: trophies, barbarian chief and presumed consort.

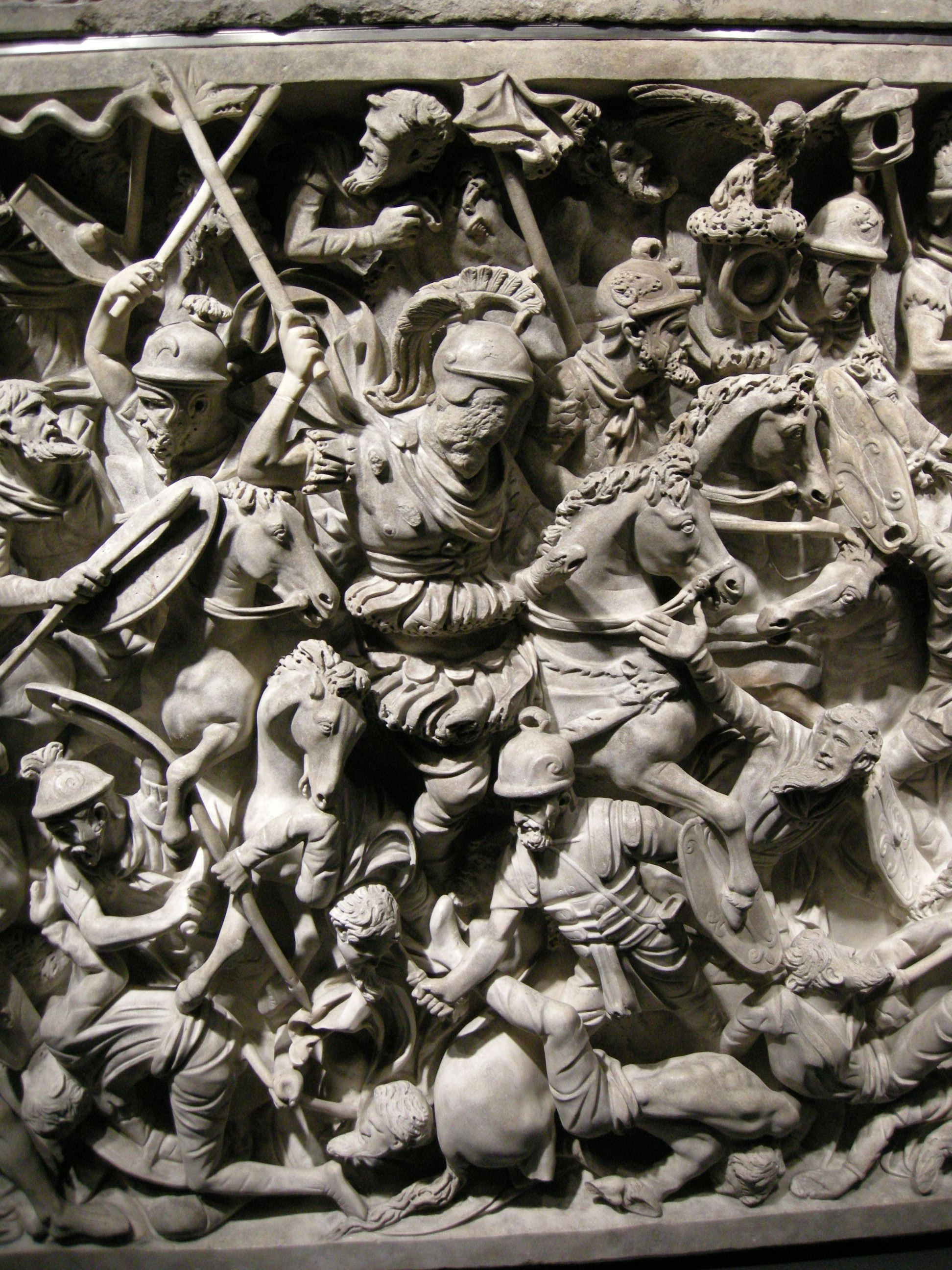
Detail of the central part, where the deceased is seen fighting against the barbarians.

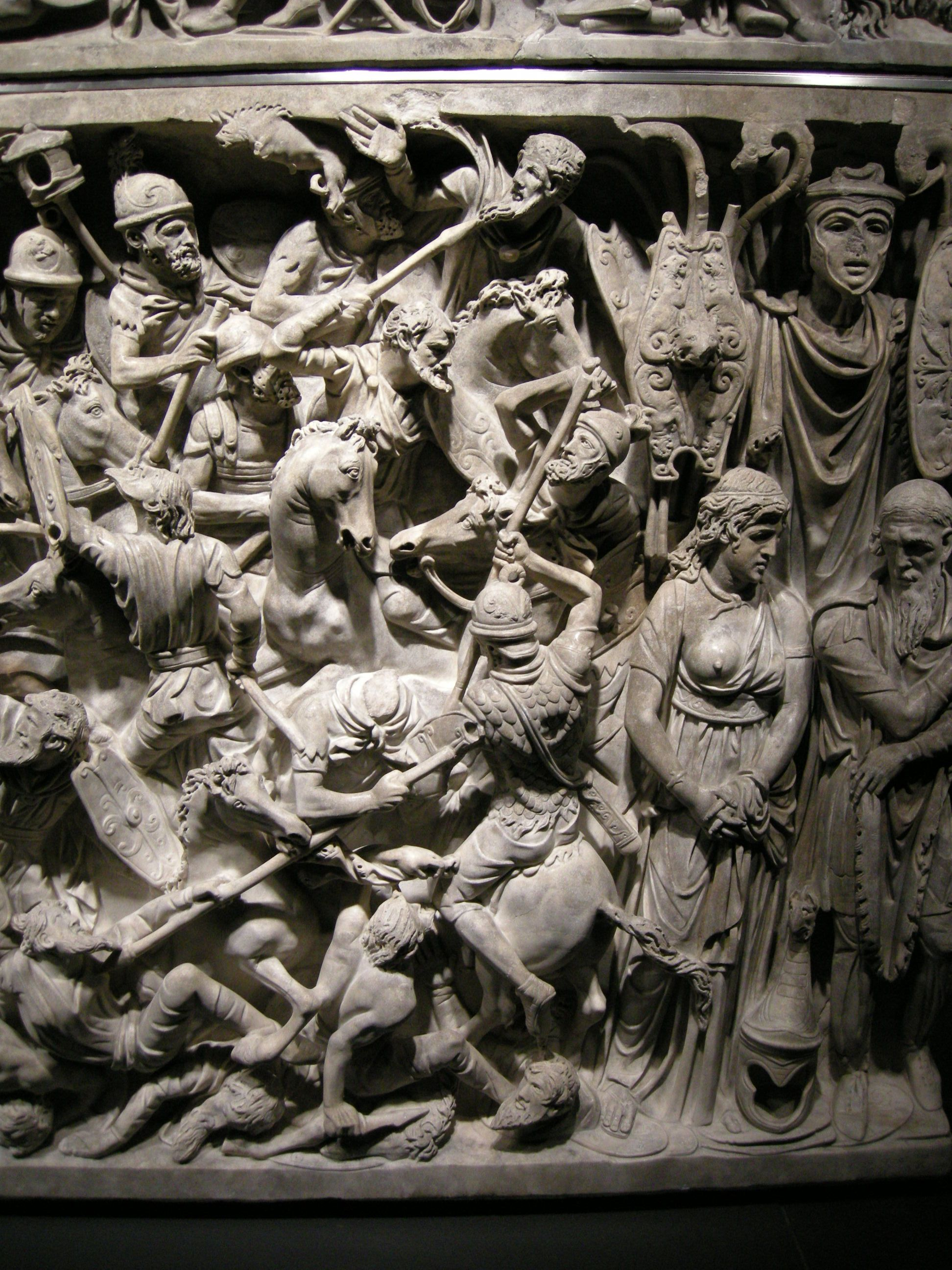
Detail of the front-right: trophies, barbarian chief with Suebian knot (people of the Quadi or Marcomanni or Buri) and presumed consort.

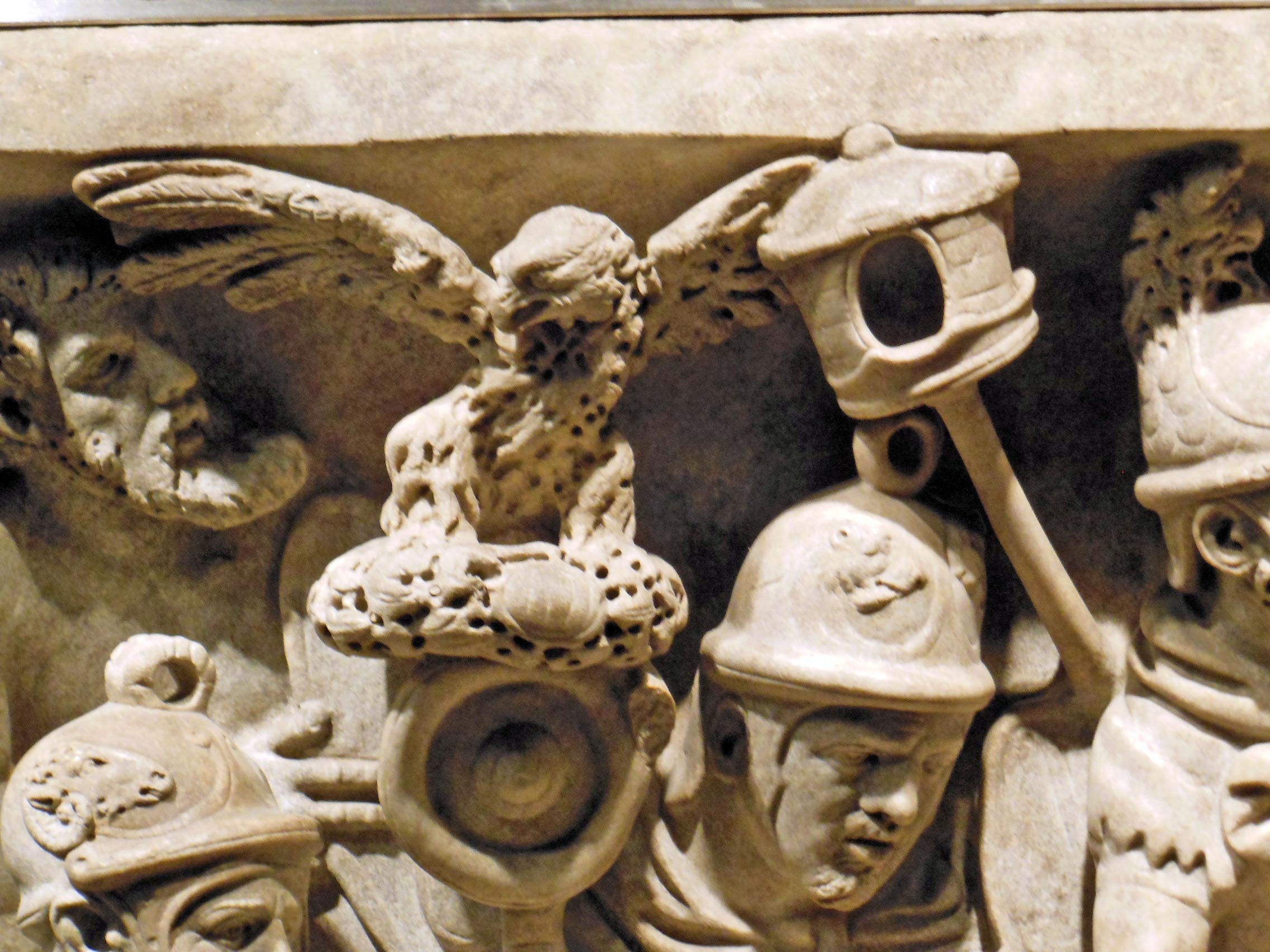
Detail with Roman insignia bearing the Roman number "IIII" symbolizing Legio IV Flavia Felix, stationed in Moesia Superior (Singidunum).

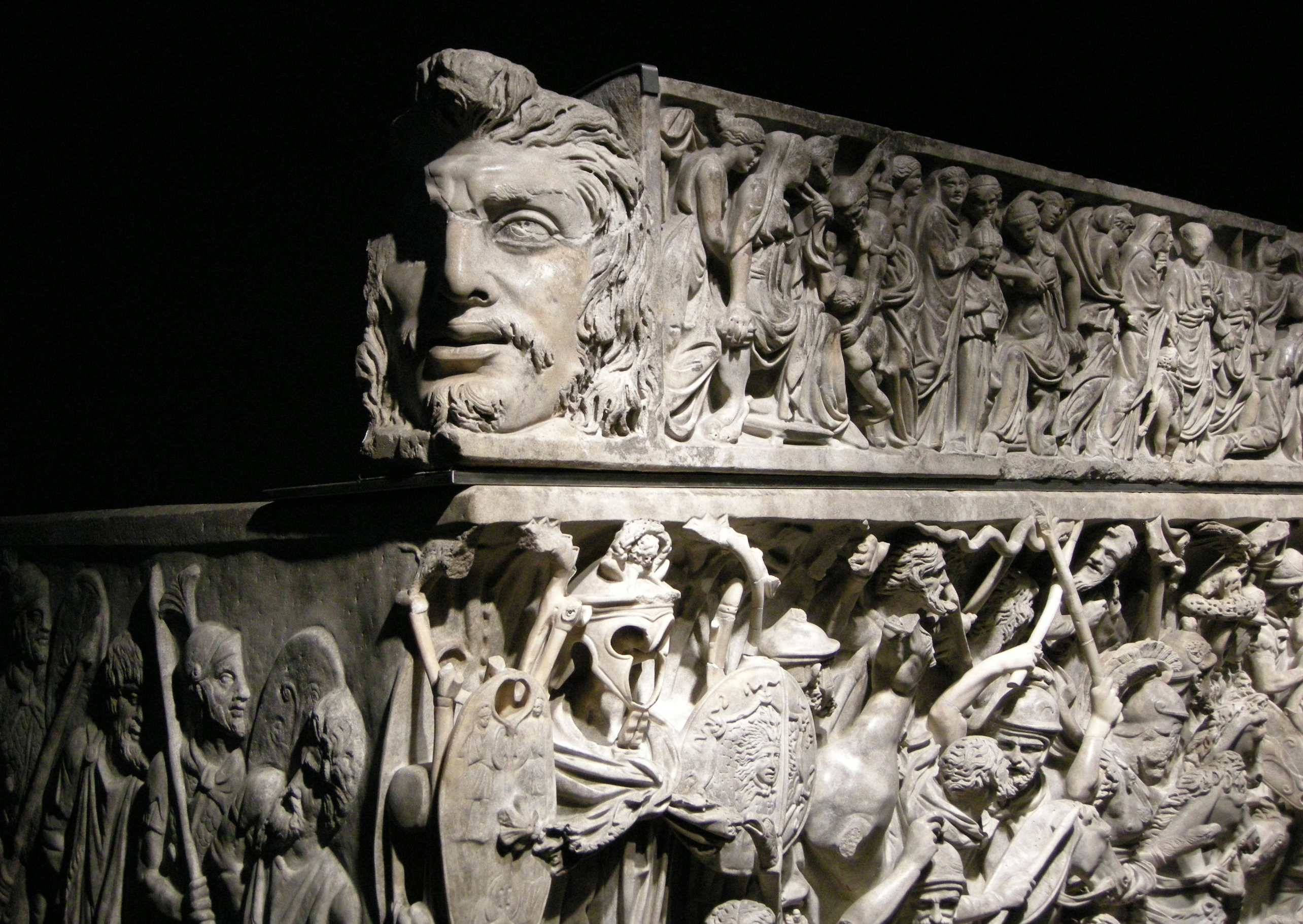
Detail of the upper part between the left side and the front side.

=== Gallery II (first floor) ===
Exhibited along "Gallery II" are a number of busts of the consorts of emperors from the 3rd-4th centuries CE, beginning with the Severan dynasty and ending with the period known as the military anarchy (cf. 3rd century crisis). Among them are those of Julia Domna (wife of Septimius Severus) and Fulvia Plautilla (wife of Caracalla), characterized by complex hairstyles; those of Etruscilla (wife of Decius) and Salonina (wife of Gallienus) distinguished by classicist hairstyles; and a crowned head in a particularly courtly and elegant style typical of the Constantinian court.

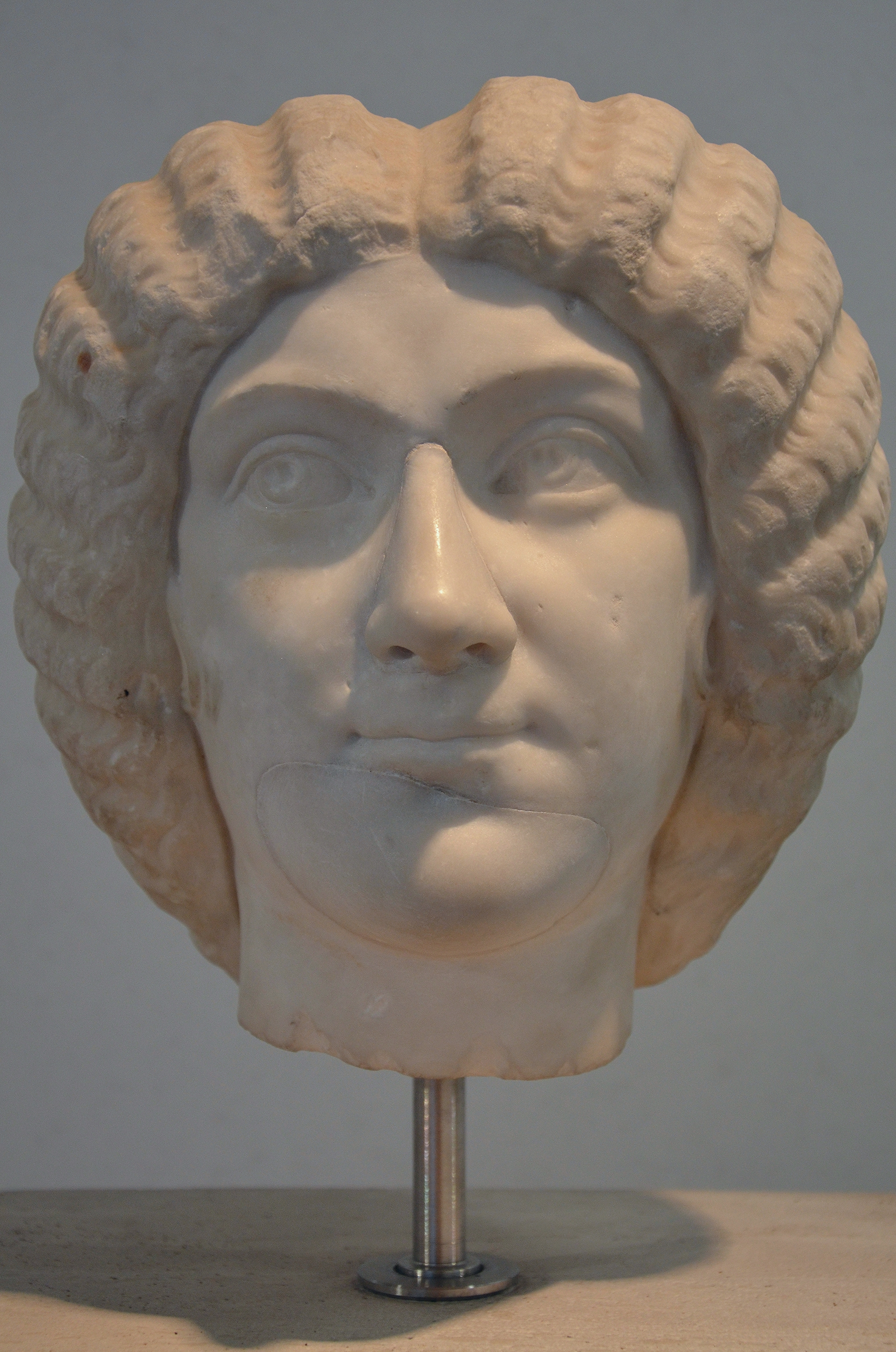
Julia Domna, wife of Emperor Septimius Severus (193-211)

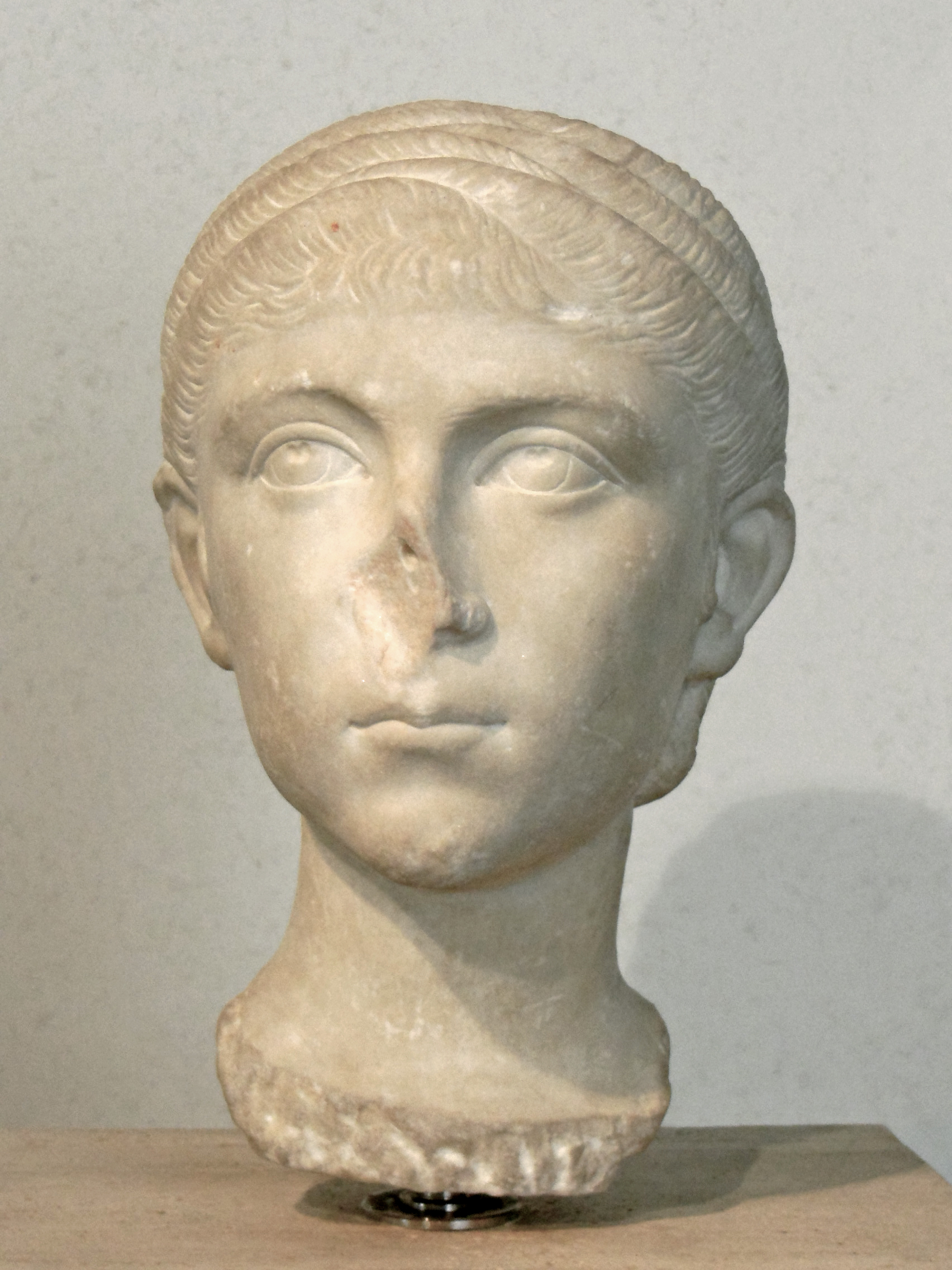
Fulvia Plautilla, wife of Caracalla (211-217), was executed in 212

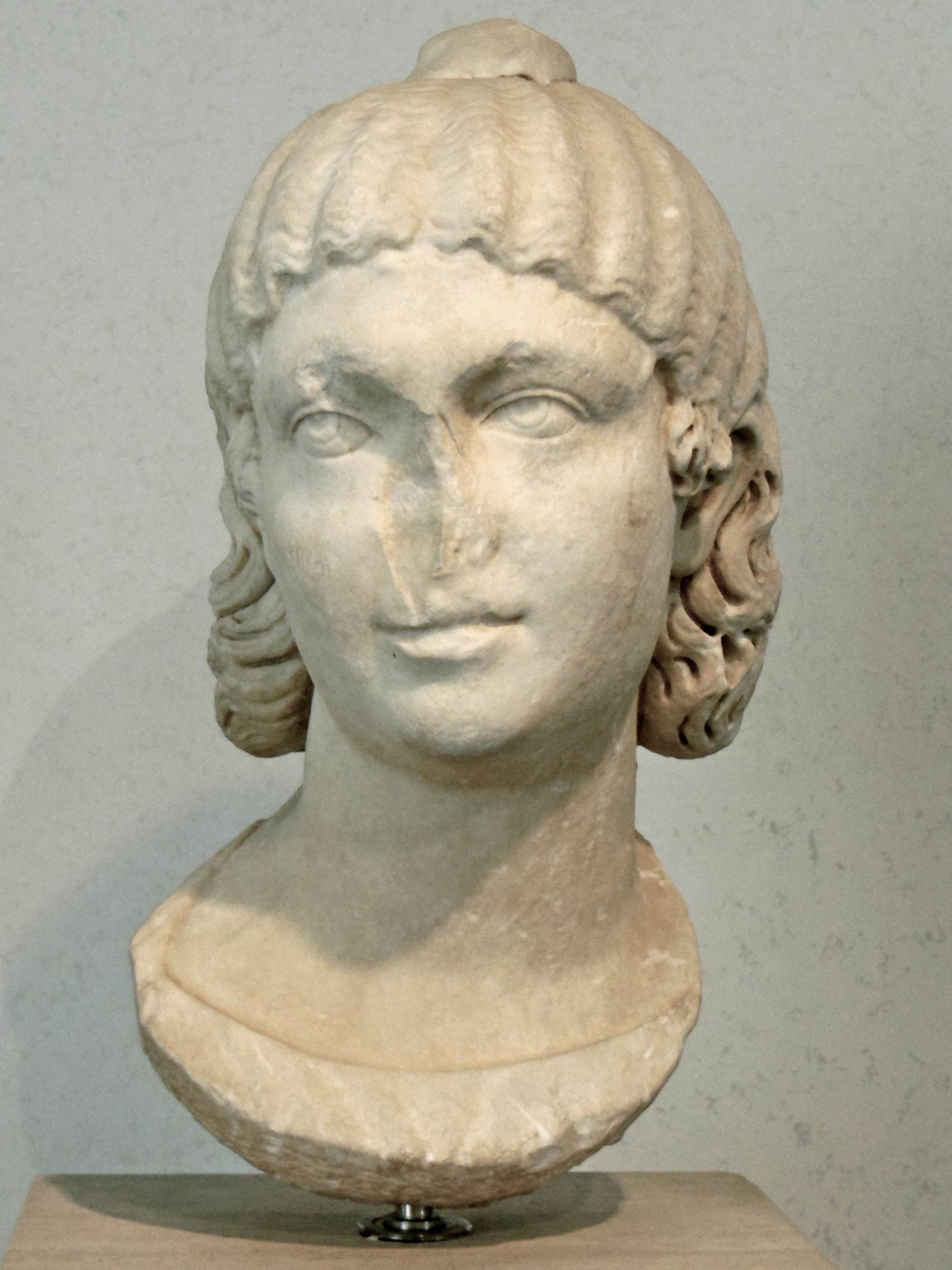
Furia Sabinia Tranquillina, wife of Gordian III (238-244)

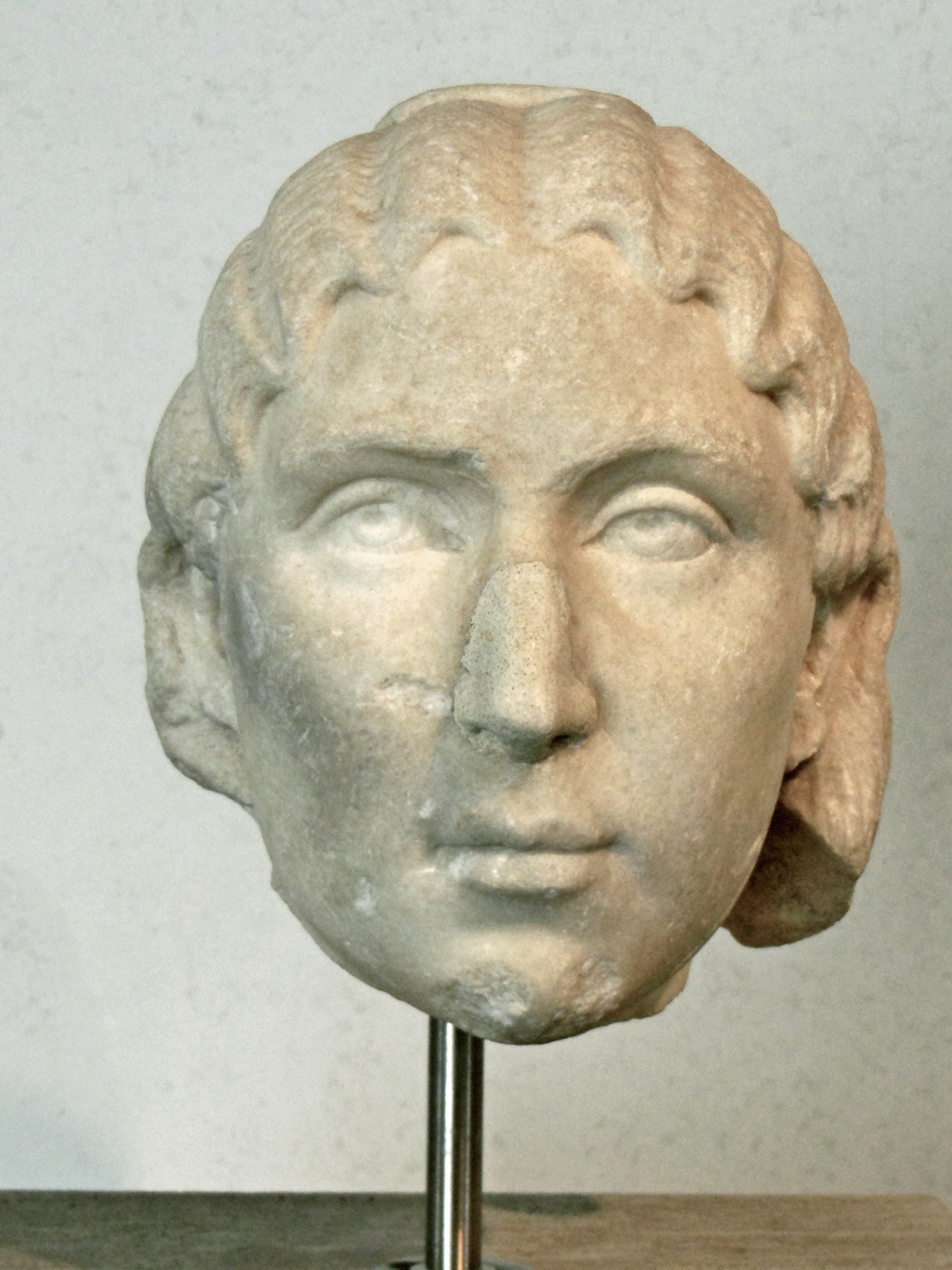
Marcia Otacilia Severa, wife of Philip the Arab (244-249)

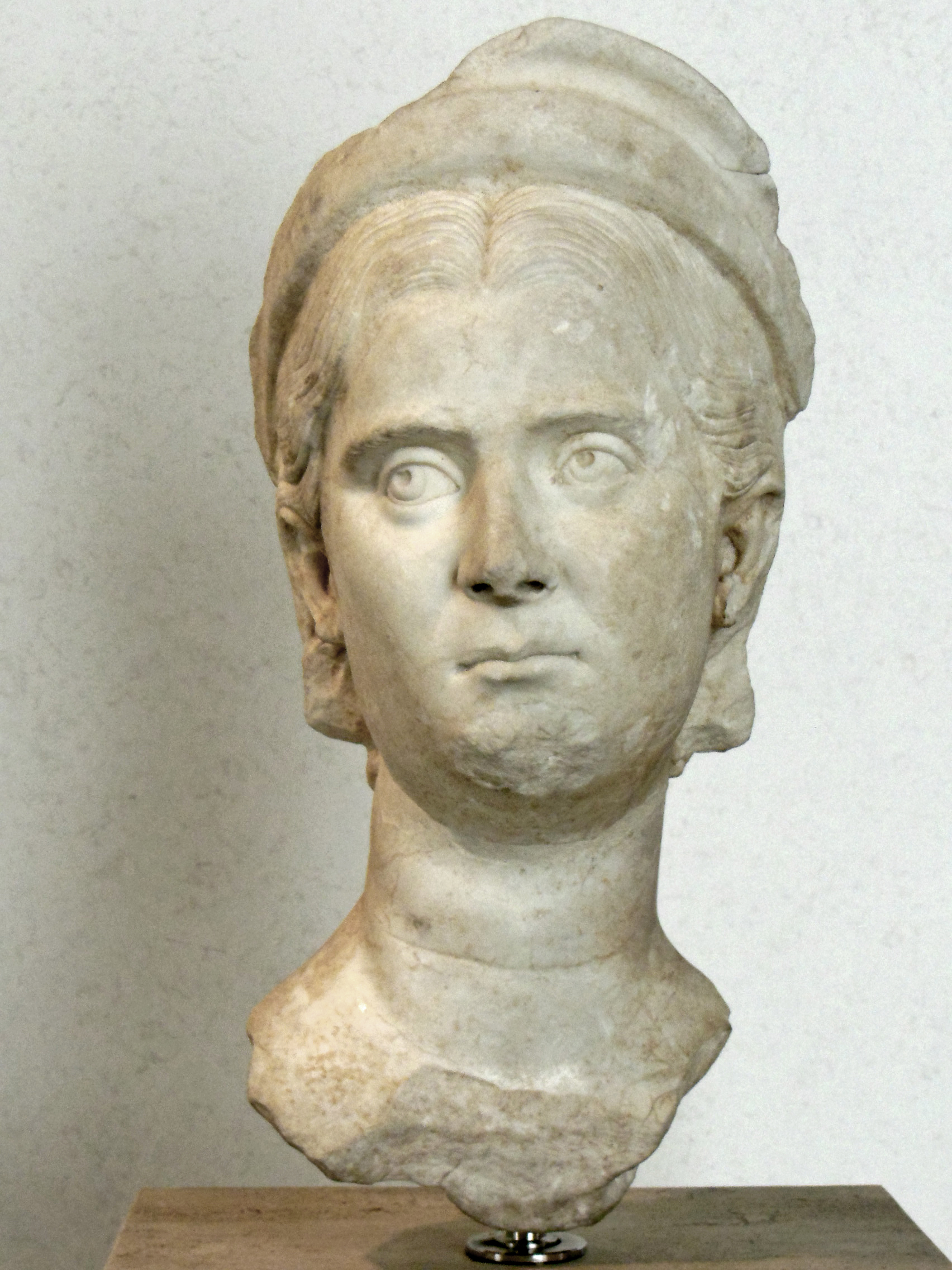
Portrait of Herennia Cupressenia Etruscilla, wife of Emperor Decius (249-251)

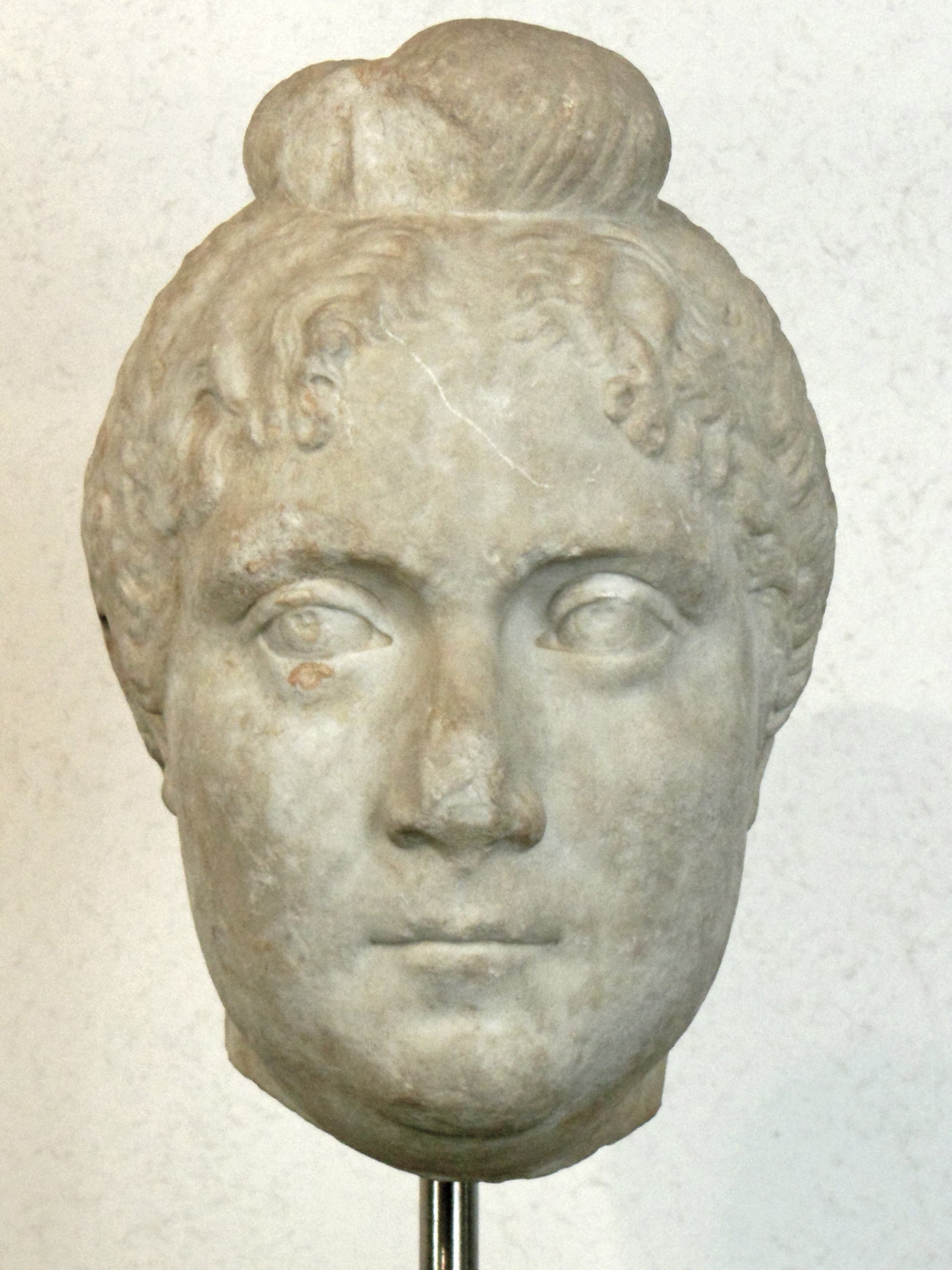
Head of Cornelia Salonina, wife of Emperor Gallienus (253-268)

=== Room XIII (first floor) ===
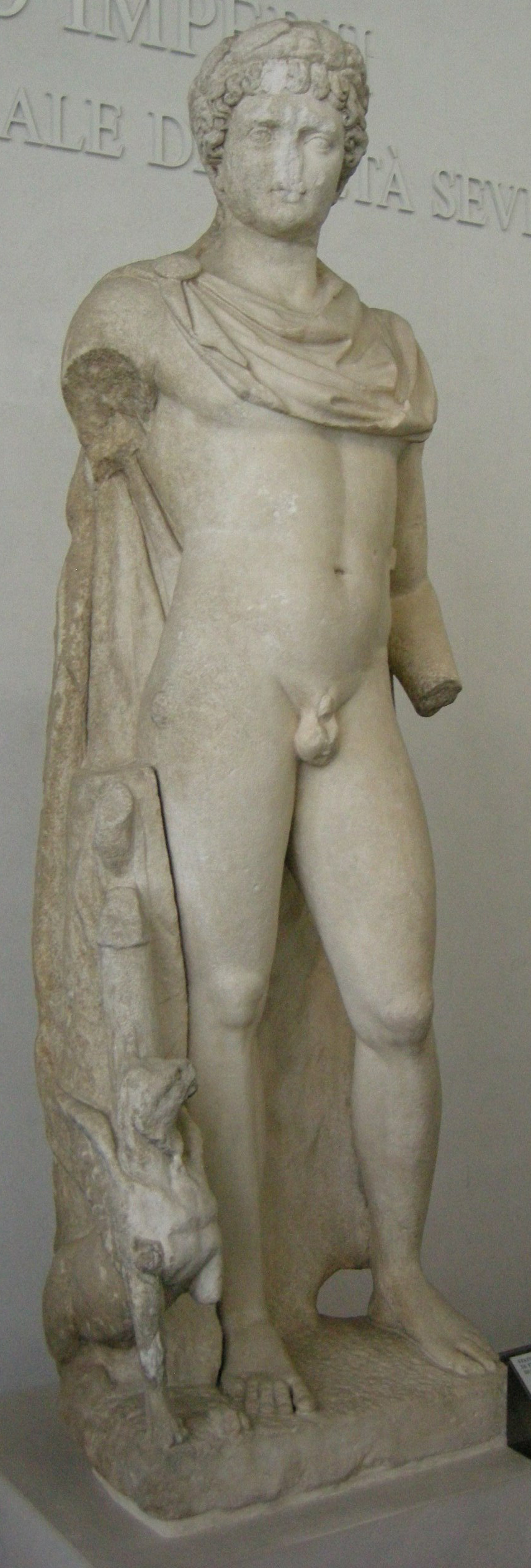
Statue of Geta, depicted as the god Apollo in heroic nudity (Albano Laziale; 209-212)

"Room XIII" features the display of sculptures reserved for the African-born dynasty of the Severans (193-235), which had in Septimius Severus its progenitor (193-211), continued with his son Caracalla (reign 211-217) and ended with Alexander Severus (reign 222-235), which was followed by the period known as military anarchy.

In the hall is a loricate bust of Septimius Severus in Greek marble from Ostia, which shows remarkable continuity with the image of the Antonines, from whom he claimed descent, to legitimize his own imperial investiture. The collection continues with a portrait of Caracalla in Greek marble, from the Via Cassia (found in 1948), which instead has a very short beard and shows an early shift toward what was his father's imperial image. The face seems to suggest an intense spirituality, typical of the third century, but also a wrathful, shy, non-benevolent recalcitrance.

There are also a number of portraits of his brother Geta, most notably a statue in which he is depicted as a young Apollo. Geta had initially been associated with the throne by his brother in 211 upon the death of his father, and then in 212 had been assassinated, while his statues suffered damnatio memoriae. Another image showing the evolution of the imperial portrait is a colossal head of Severus Alexander, which appears frontally and with solemn composure.

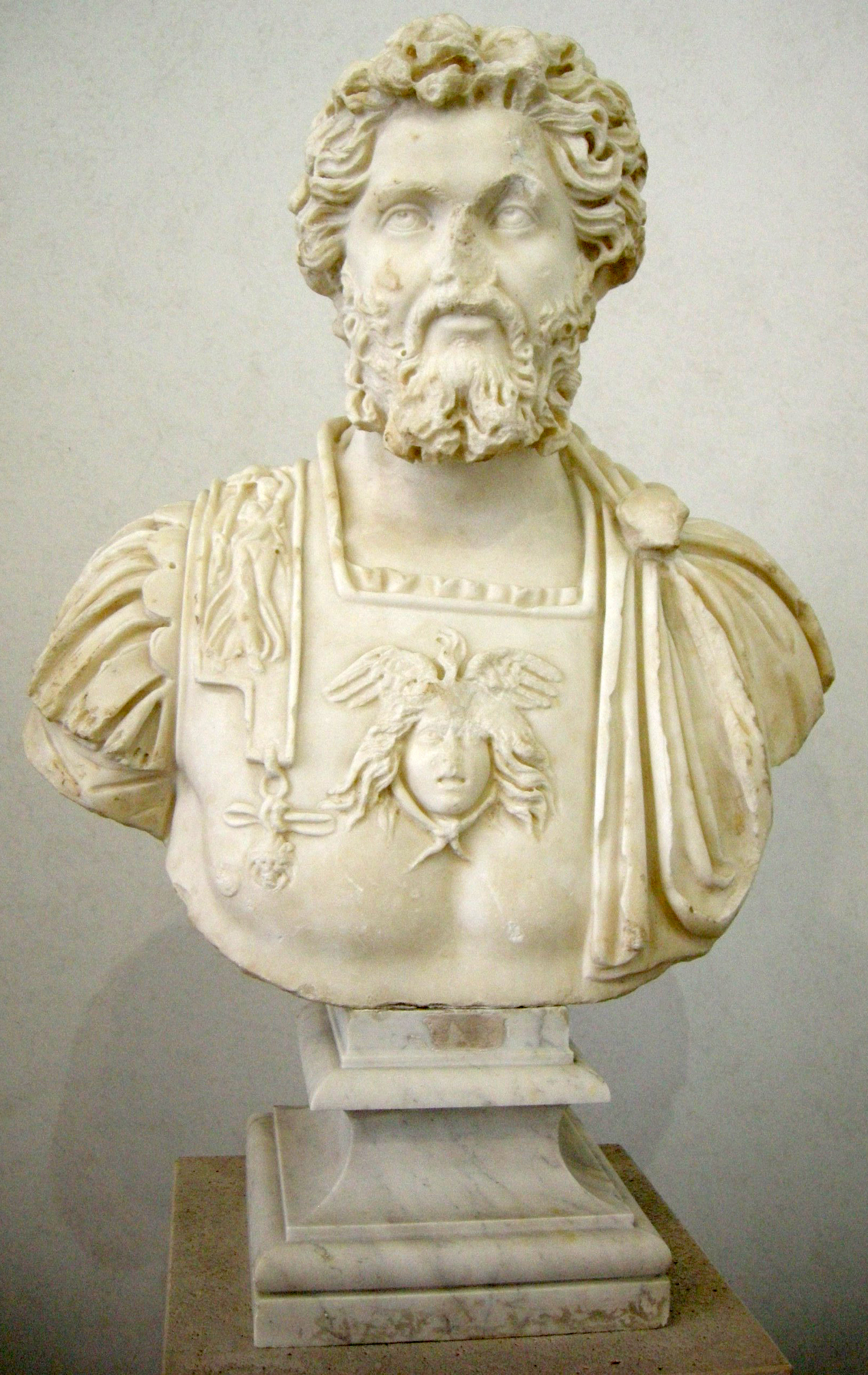
Bust of Septimius Severus from Ostia (193-211; h. 69 cm; inv. 345)

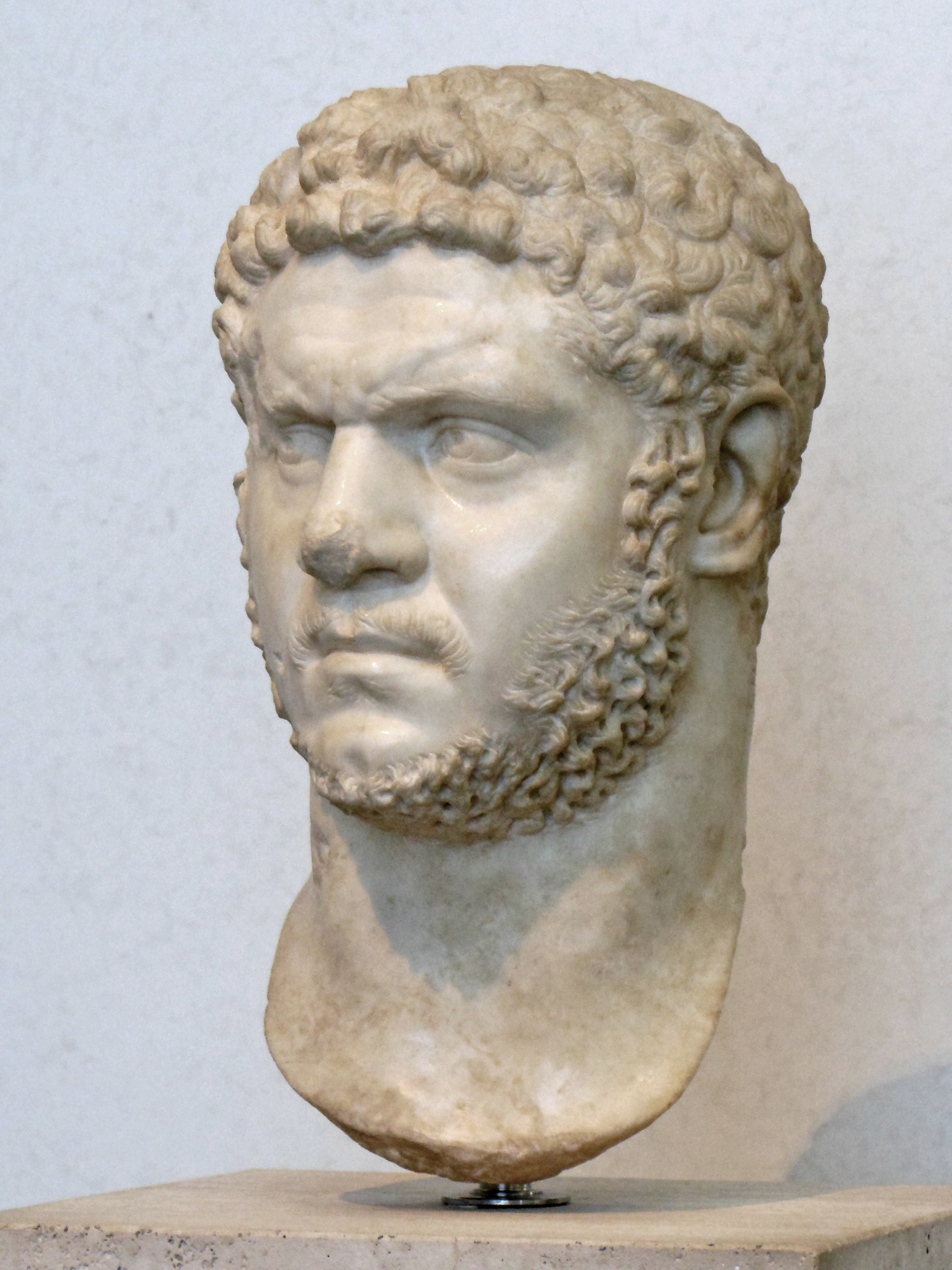
Bust of Caracalla (211-217) from the Via Cassia (h. 35 cm; inv. 125,565)

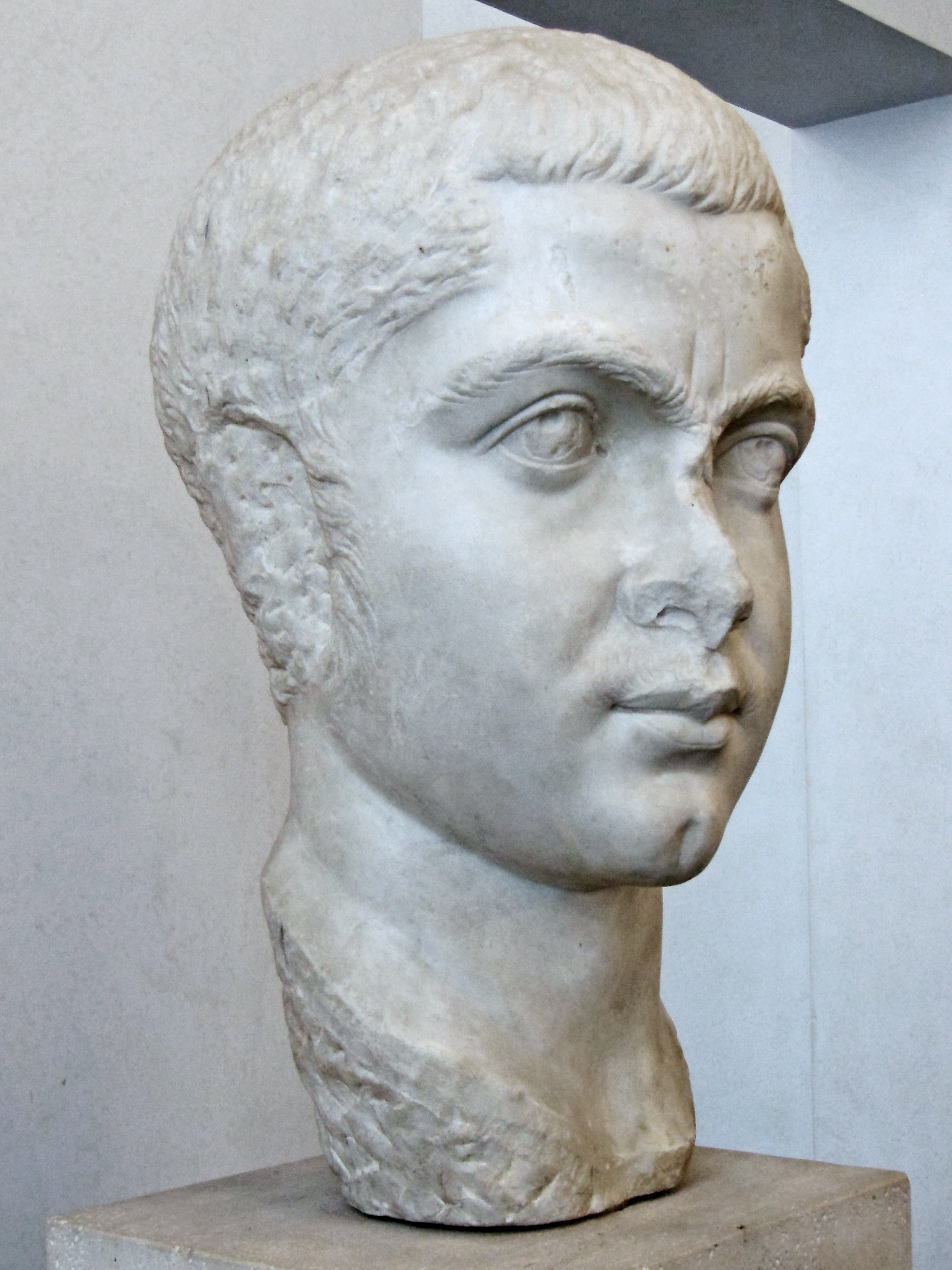
Portrait of Geta, son of Septimius Severus

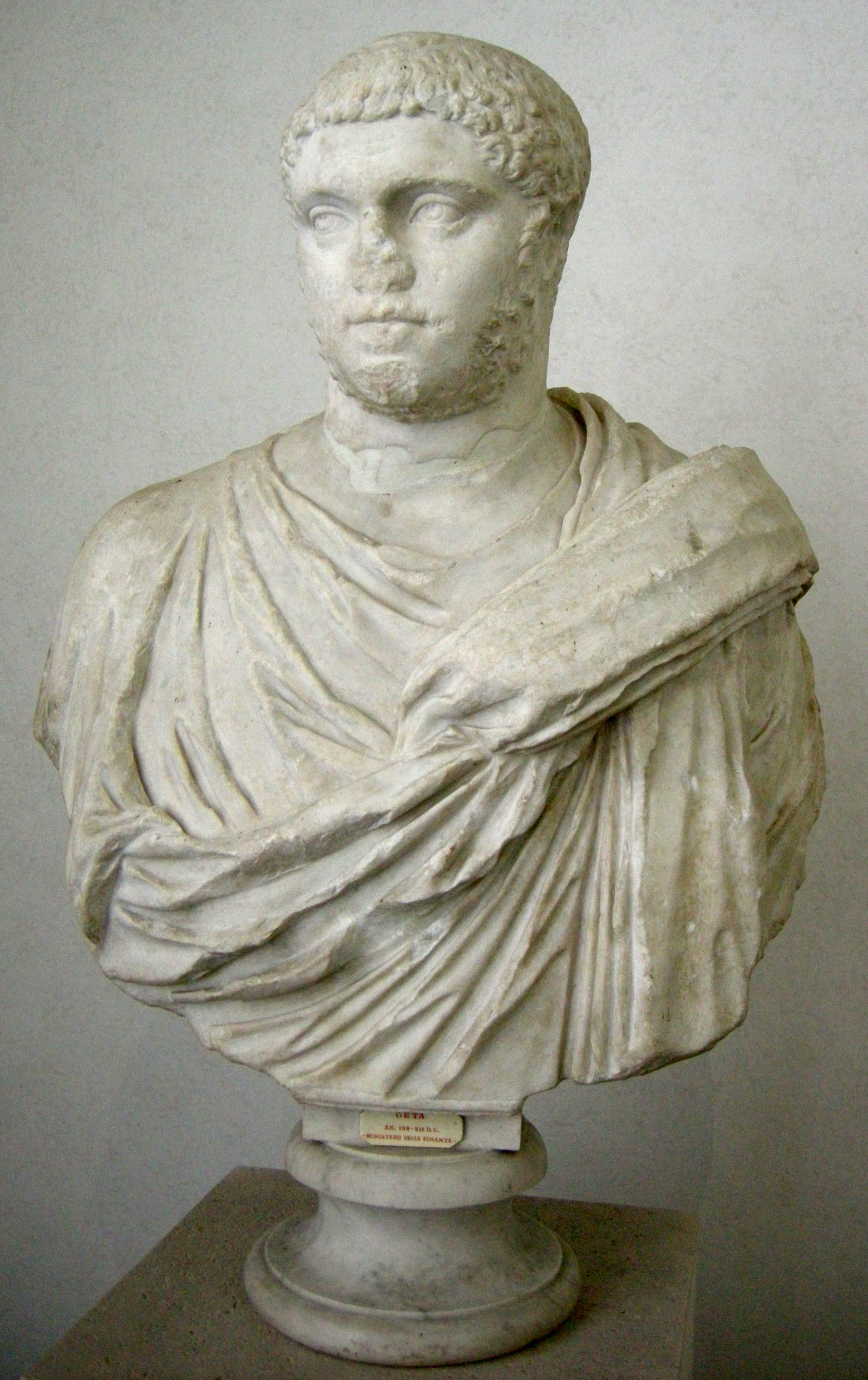
Bust of Geta (from Via XX Settembre in Rome)

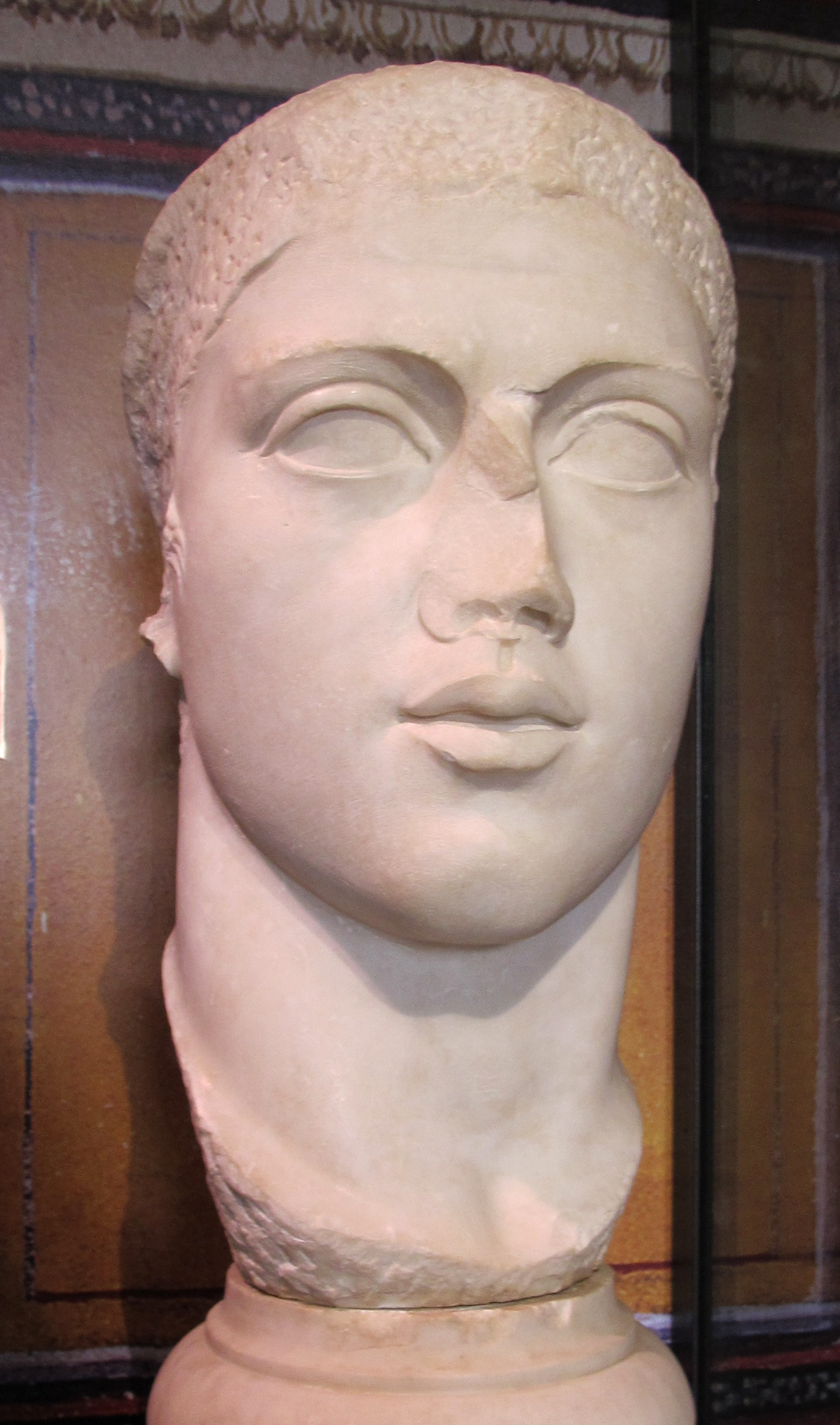
Colossal portrait of Alexander Severus from Ostia (222-235)

=== Room XIV (first floor) ===
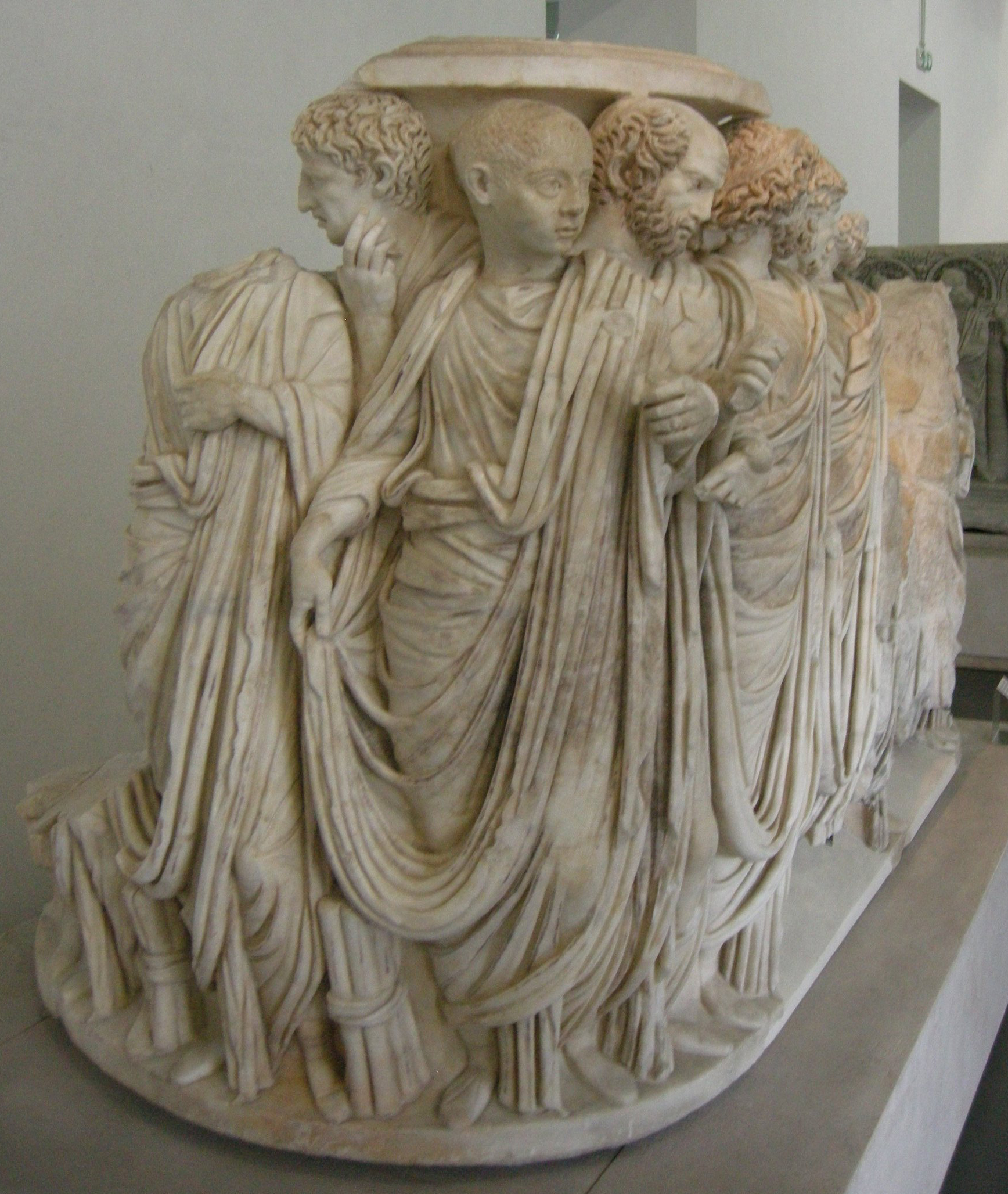
Sarcophagus of Acilia

The large "Room XIV" displays works ranging from the period of so-called military anarchy (which followed the death of Alexander Severus) to a new recovery of imperial power with Diocletian's tetrarchic reform (284-305) and the establishment of Constantine I (306-337), the latter marking the birth of the Christian empire. Matteo Cadario also believes that there were important changes in the artistic conception of this period, which he summarizes as follows:

Realistic and classicist portraiture were left out with a few exceptions [...], in order to seek the expression of charisma through connection with divinity [...], preferring abstraction to naturalism.

— Guida al Museo Nazionale Romano, Matteo Cadario, Palazzo Massimo alle Terme (2005, p. 47).

The room displays a series of sarcophagi from the 3rd century: the sarcophagus of the Muses shows the heroization of the deceased through culture, represented by the Muses enclosed within small niches; the sarcophagus of the Annona is in the popular style with symbolic depiction of the trade and distribution of grain (alluding to Flavius Arabianus' office of praefectus annonae), decorated with eight figures in relief against the background of a parapetasma (curtain), with two spouses celebrating the dextrarum iunctio in the center, above a small altar; the sarcophagus of Acilia, which, in the figure-portrait of the youth, has been recognized as Emperor Gordian III (238-244), according to the identification of Ranuccio Bianchi Bandinelli, while other scholars, with less persuasive arguments, recognize the youth Nigrinian, son of Emperor Marcus Aurelius Carinus, or a personification of the processus consularis.

With the establishment of Christianity, a number of works from the fourth century are displayed in the room, including a number of sarcophagi, a krater made of chalky marble, a slab with scenes of miracles, and the statuette of the seated Christ teaching, as an example of Theodosian classicism. Christ is depicted as a "wonder boy" who, with his right hand raised, explains the text contained in the half-open scroll.

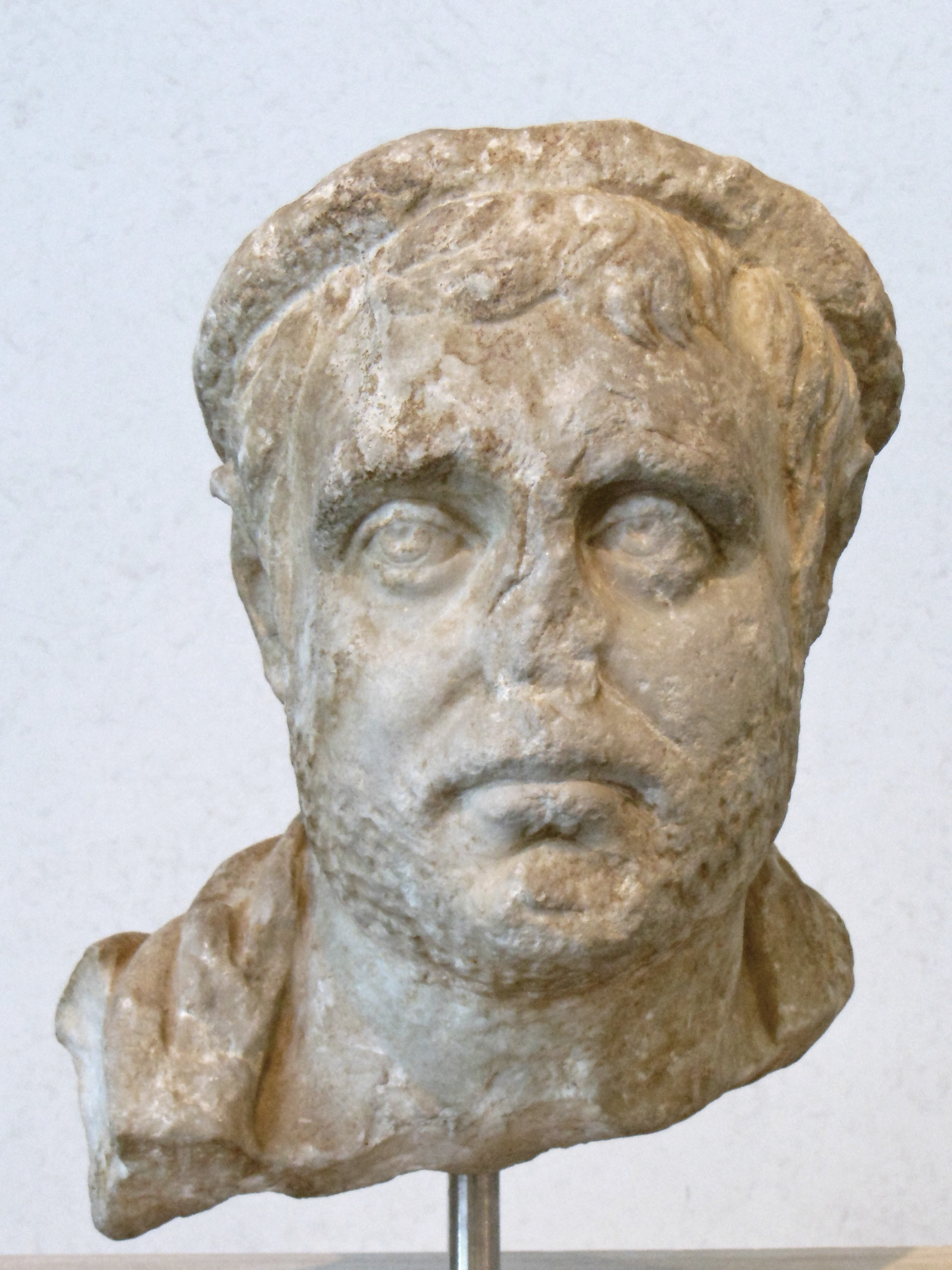
Portrait of Decimus Caelius Calvinus Balbinus (238)

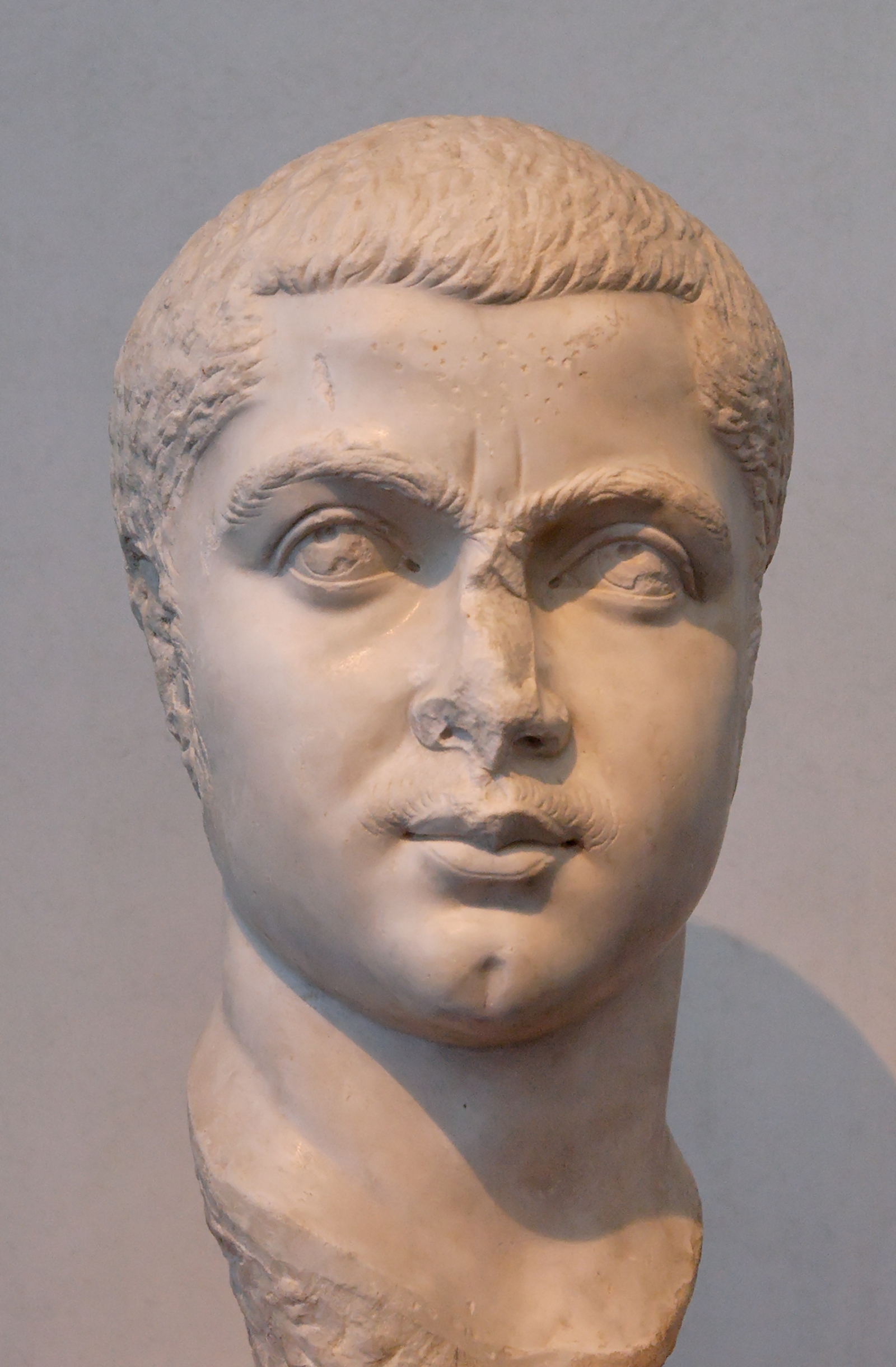
Portrait of Gordian III (238-244)

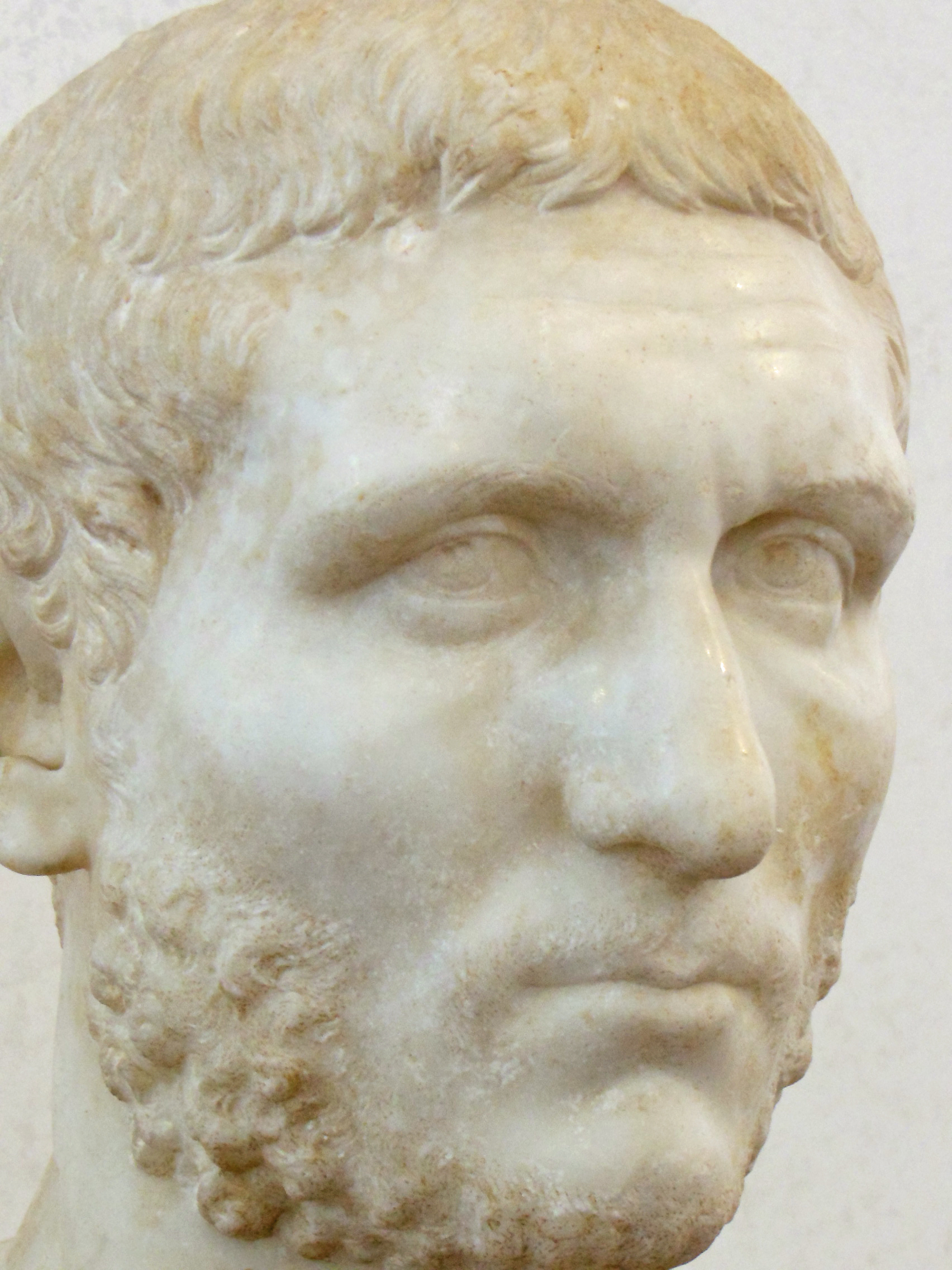
Charioteer from the age of Gallienus (from Piazza Chiesa Nuova, Rome)

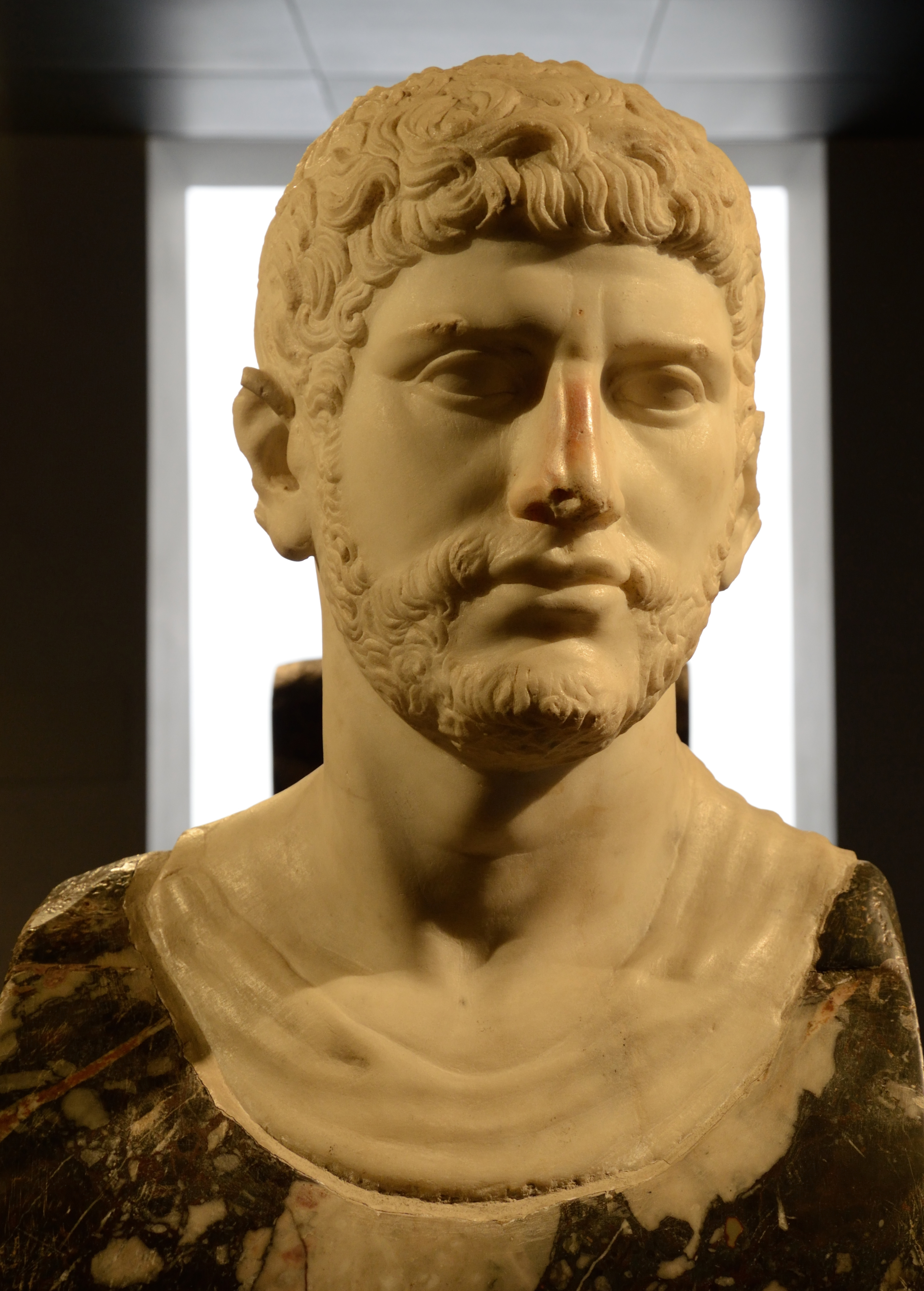
Head of bearded man

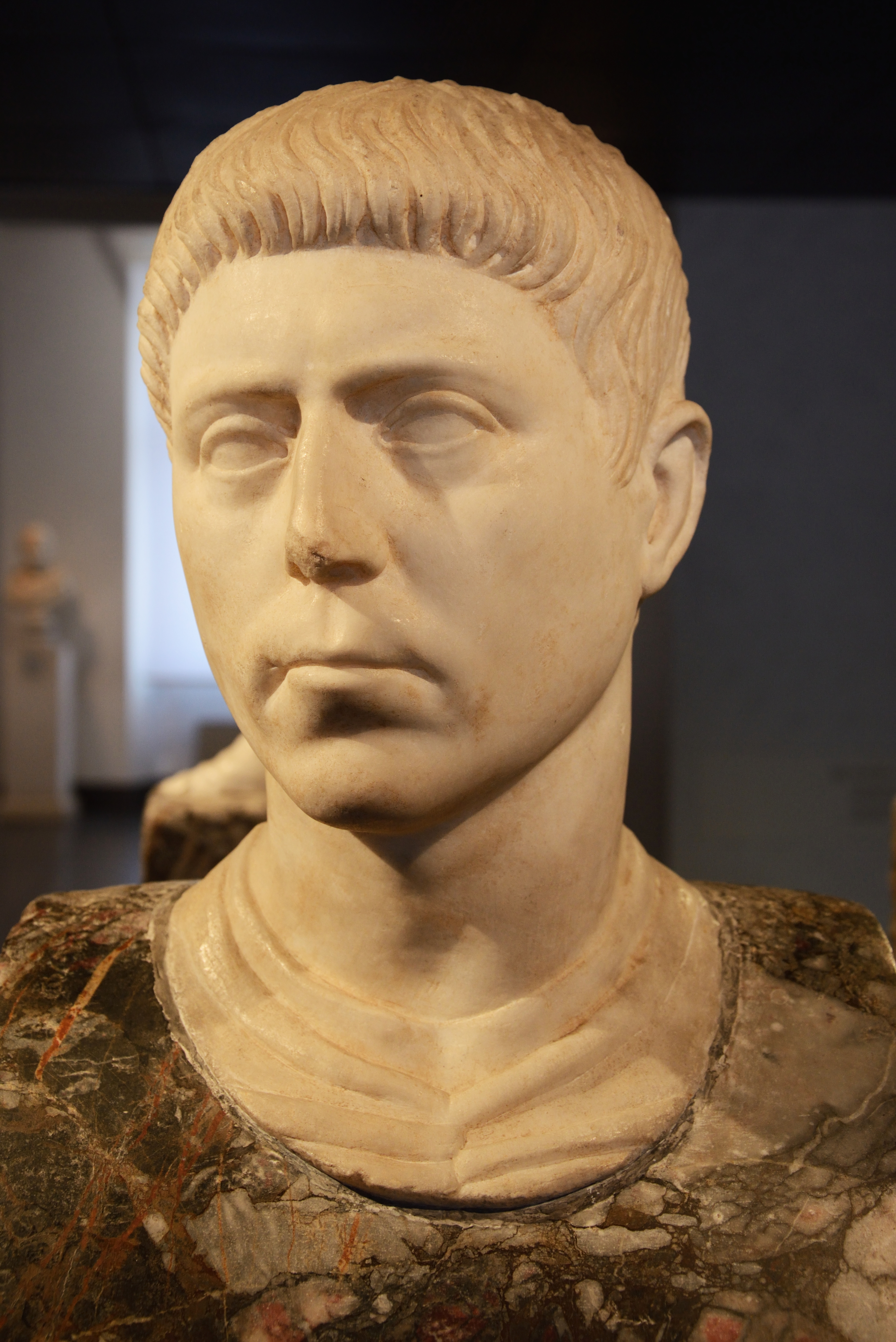
Head of a man
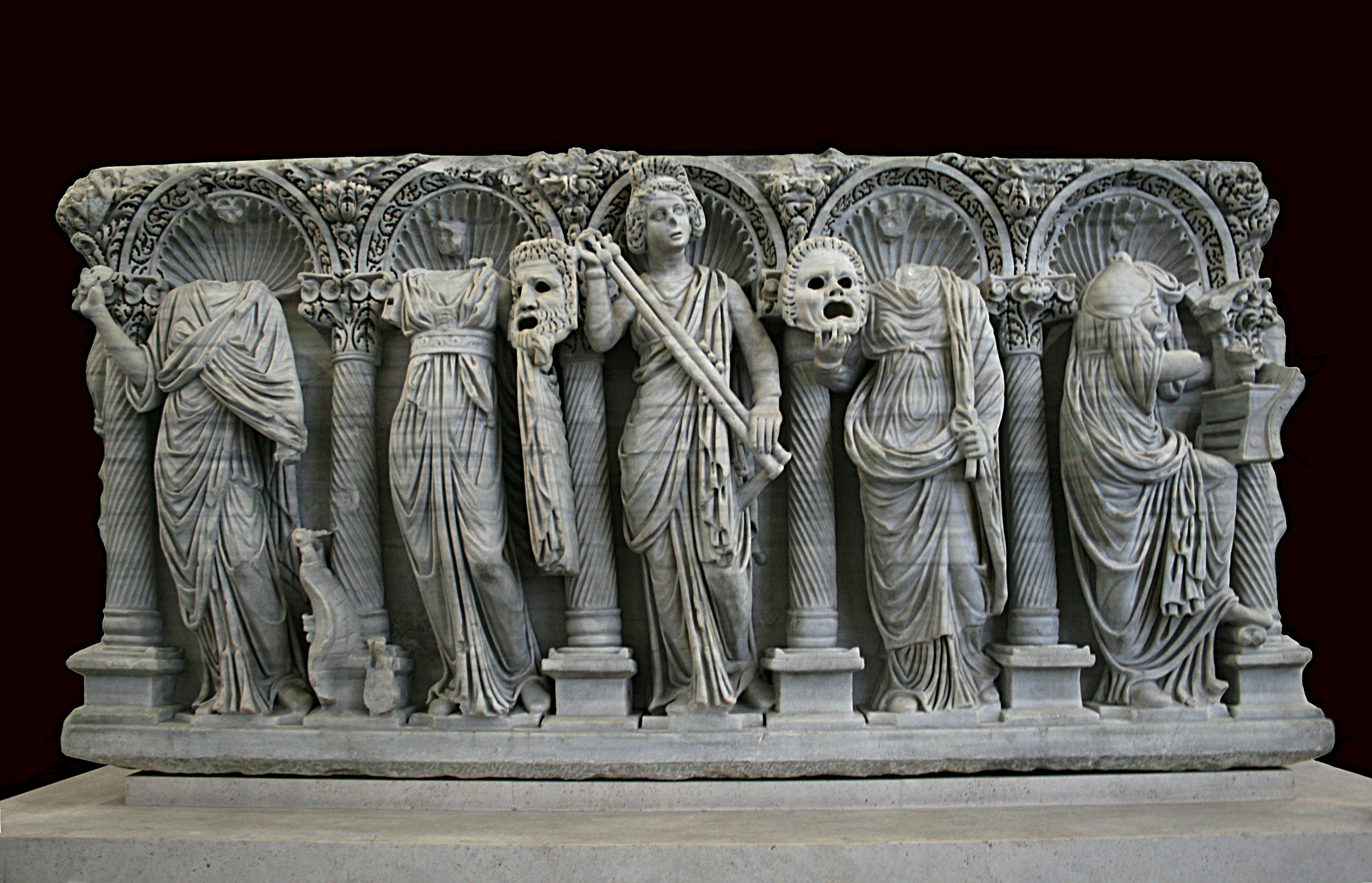
Sarcophagus of the Muses (280-290 A.D.; Villa Celimontana, Rome)

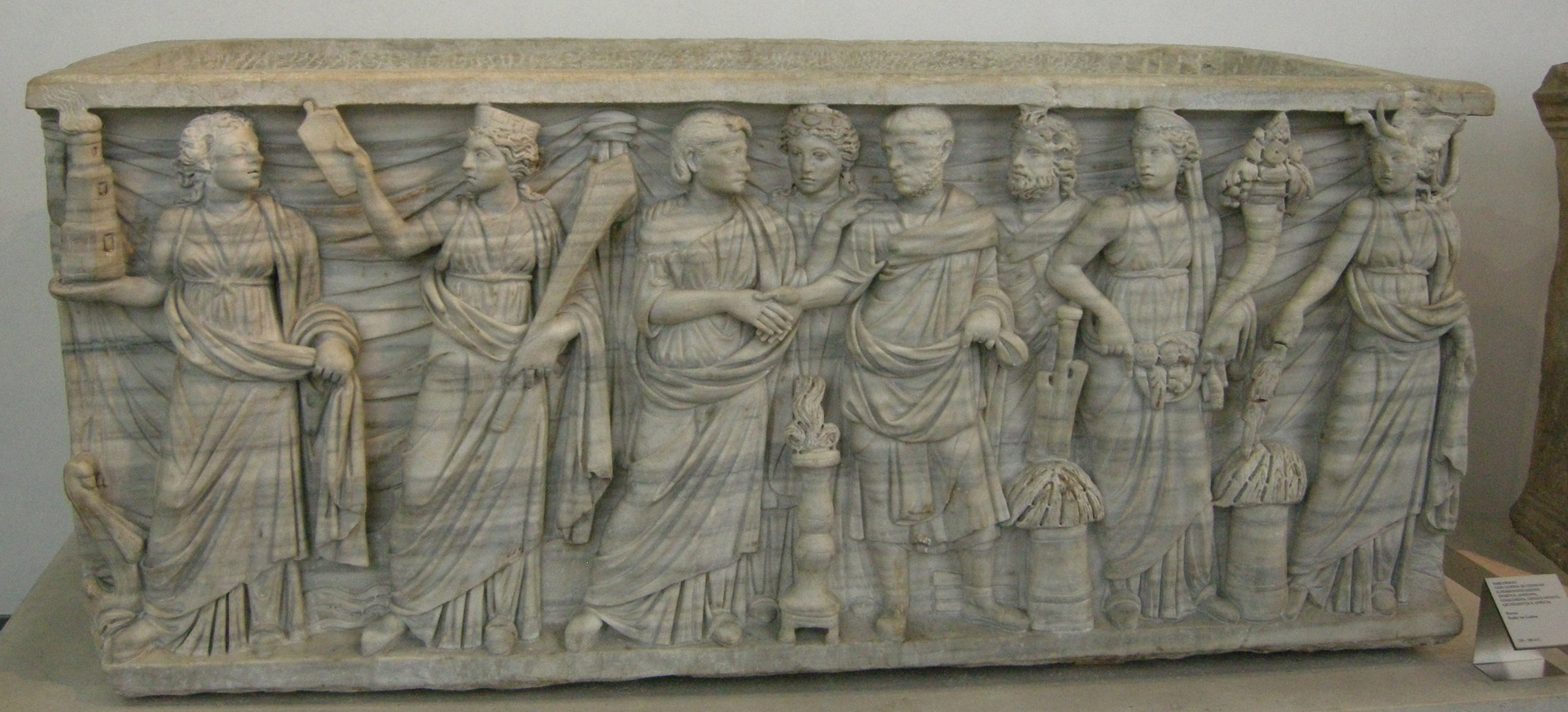
Annona sarcophagus (270-280 A.D.; inv. 40,799)

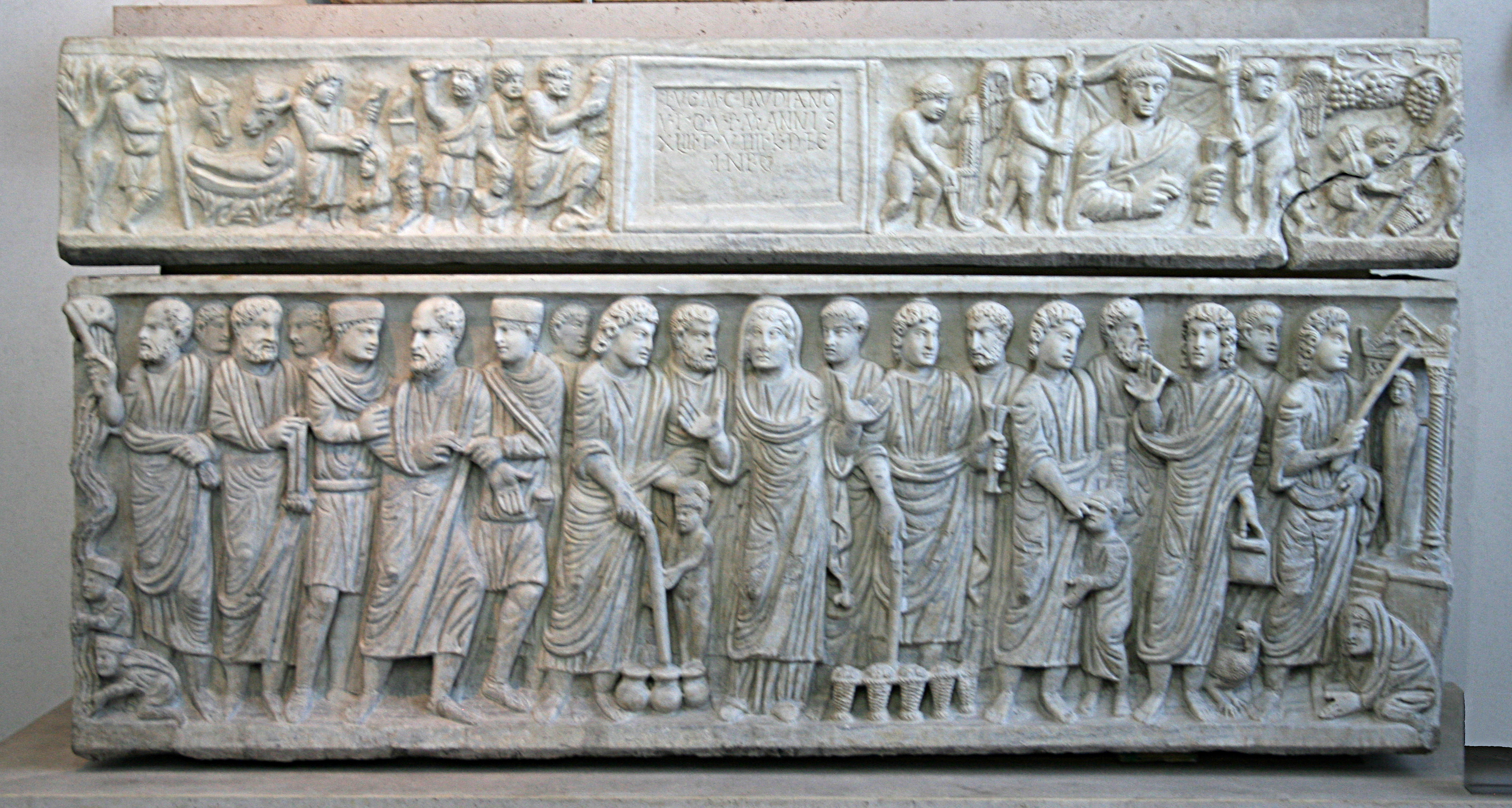
Sarcophagus of Marcus Claudianus (330-335 AD).

== Second floor ==
The second floor houses the frescoes from the underground nymphaeum of Livia's villa "ad Gallinas Albas," a locality near Prima Porta, which belonged to Livia Drusilla, the empress wife of Augustus: a trompe-l'œil depicting a garden with fruit trees and birds on all four sides.

In the other rooms are a series of wall and floor mosaics, late imperial megalographies, the panels with pompa circensis and "Hylas abducted by nymphs" from the so-called basilica of Junius Bassus, the frescoes from the "river port of St. Paul" and the section of frescoes found in the underground rooms of the "villa or house of the Farnesina" (as it was located in what were the gardens of the Villa Farnesina built by Baldassarre Peruzzi for Agostino Chigi and later razed in the late 19th century to allow the opening of the Lungotevere). The frescoed rooms were restored, refurbished and inaugurated on June 30, 2010.

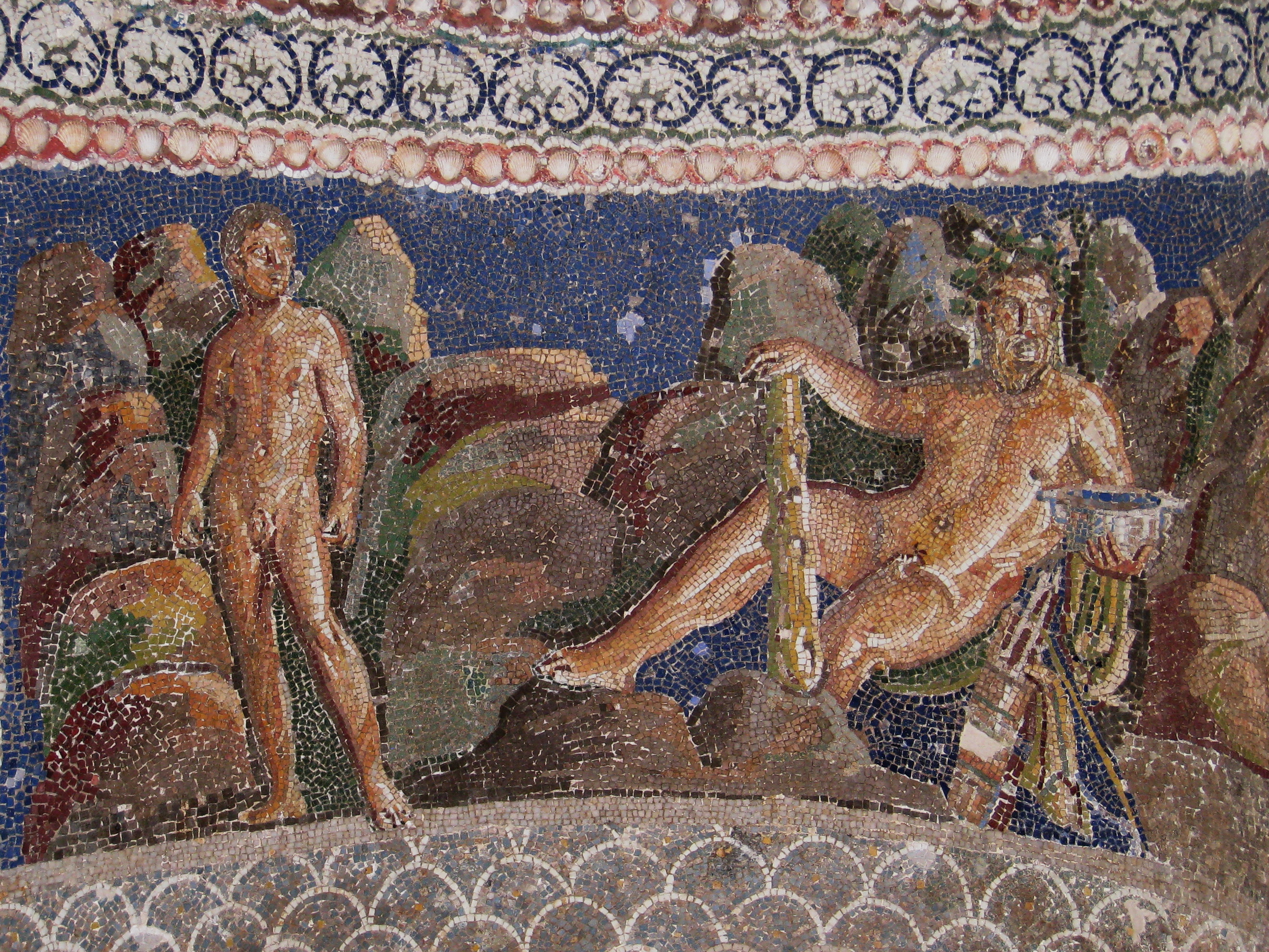
Mosaic

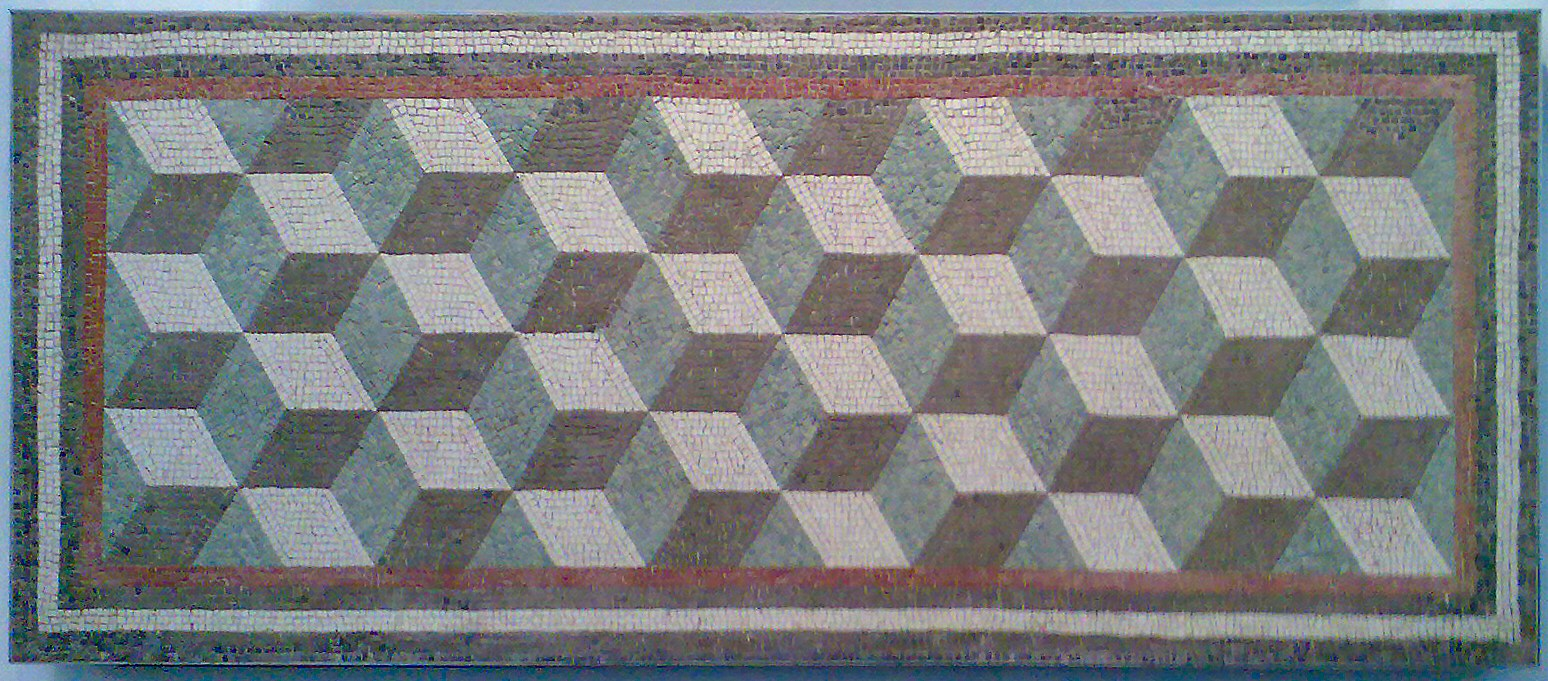
Roman mosaic with cube design producing a Necker Cube-like optical illusion.

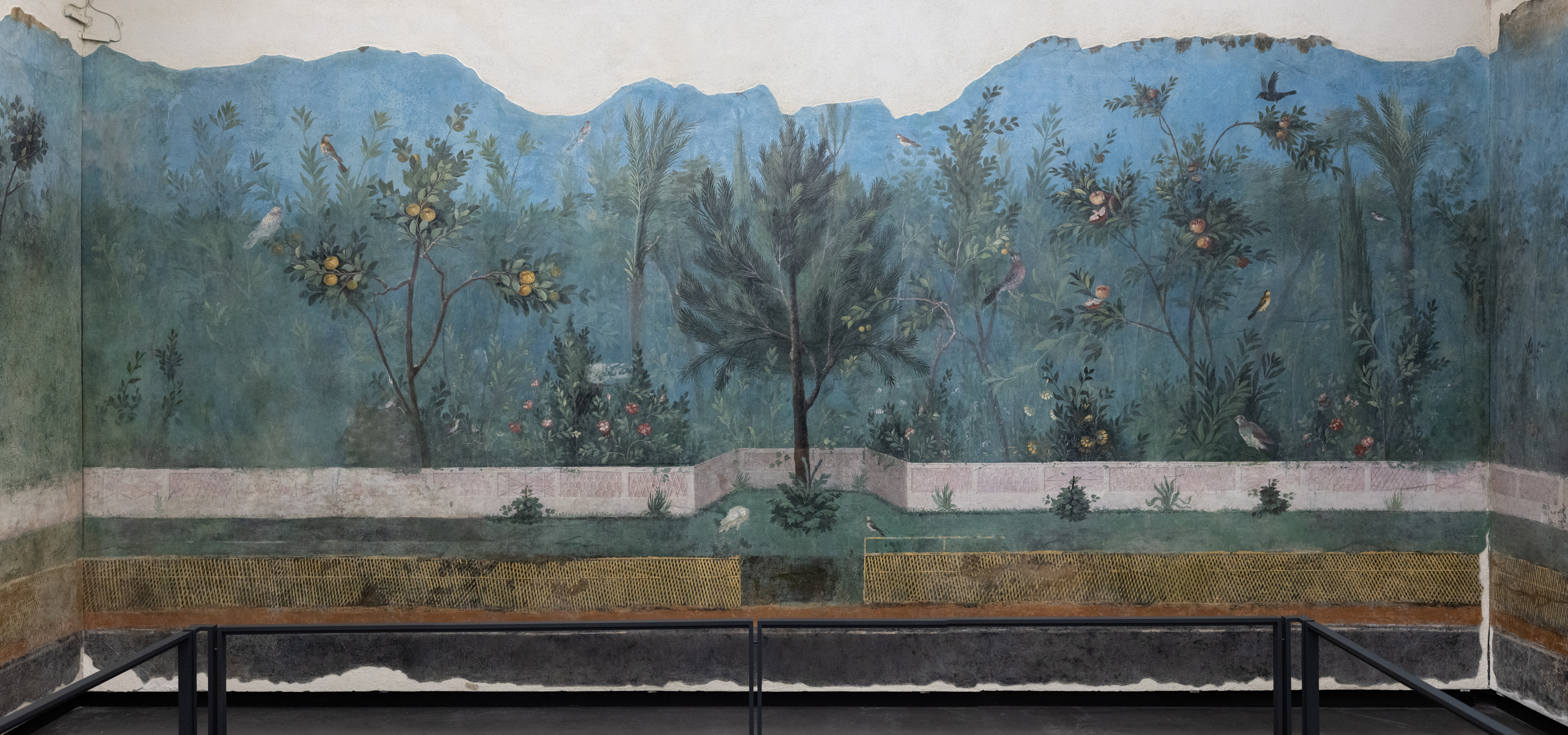
Villa of Livia garden fresco

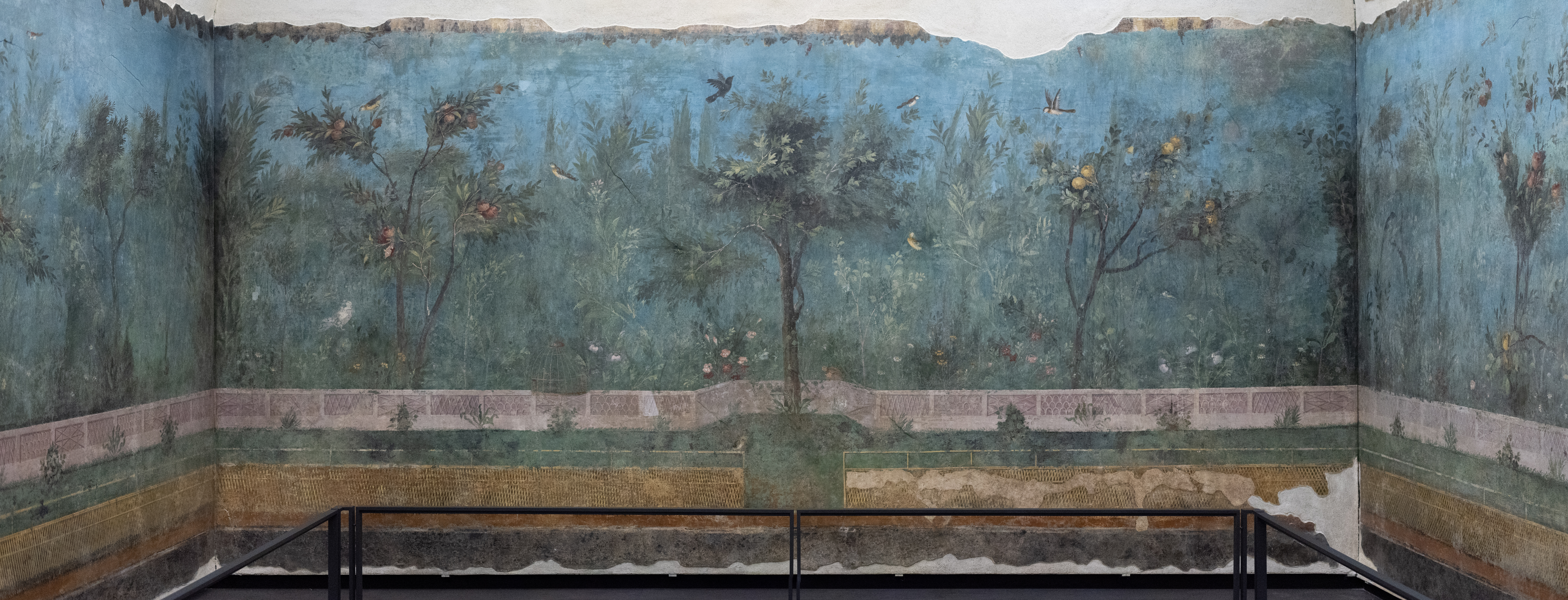
Villa of Livia garden fresco

Villa of Livia garden fresco

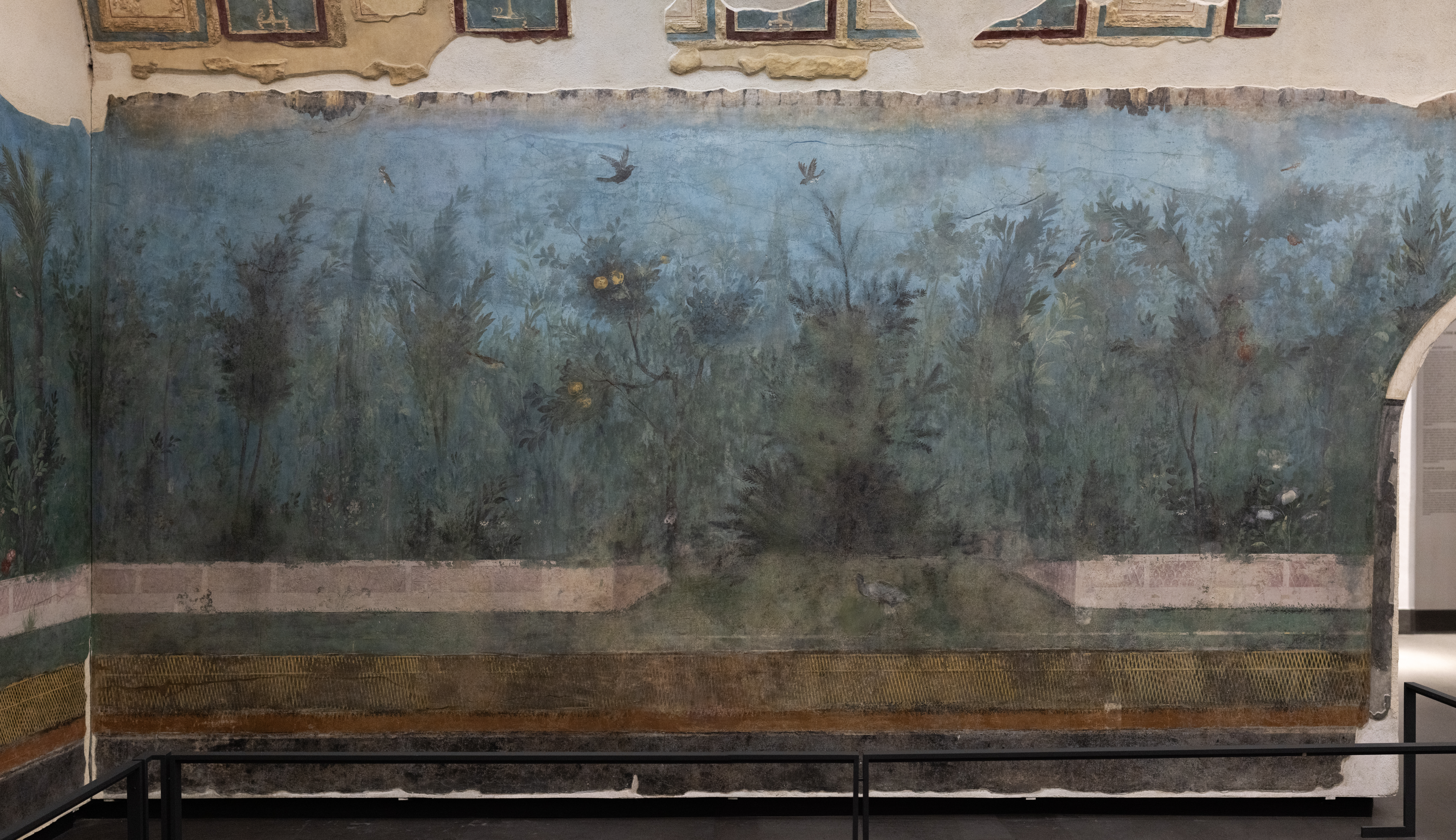
Villa of Livia garden fresco

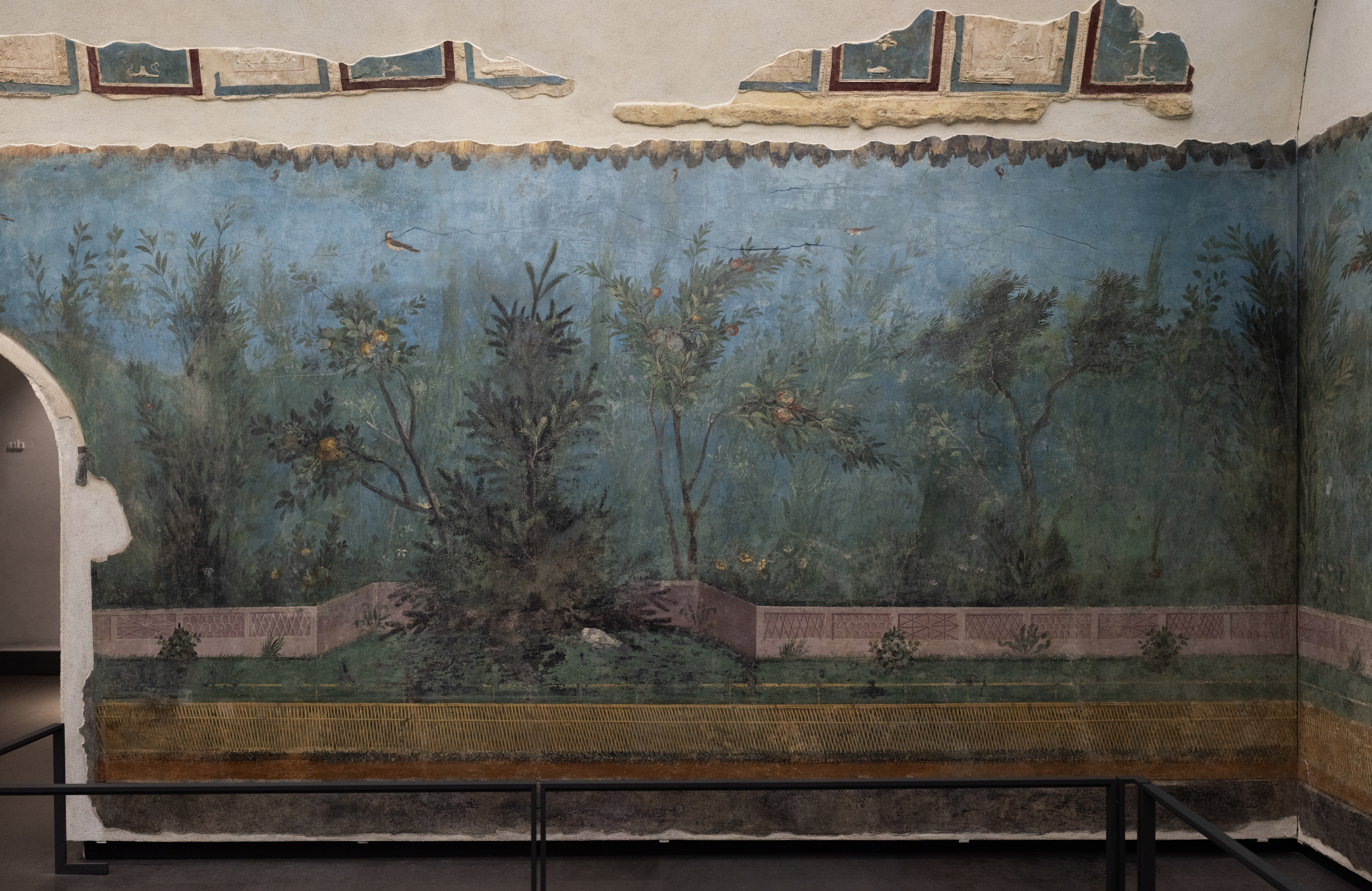
Villa of Livia garden fresco

== Basement floor (medallion room) ==
It features a section devoted to goldsmithing and a rich collection of numismatics, once belonging to Victor Emmanuel III.

It also houses the mummy of a little girl around eight years old, the so-called Grottarossa mummy, dating from around the second century A.D.; found on the Via Cassia inside a sarcophagus along with her funerary set, which is also on display; it is the only mummy from the Roman era ever found.

Another unique find in this section are the imperial regalia, consisting of sceptres surmounted by glass and chalcedony orbs, ceremonial spears and standard-bearers’ staffs, discovered on the slopes of the Palatine Hill in 2005. The insignia were carefully stored in a leather bag and concealed in an underground chamber beneath the ruins of a terrace dating from the Neronian period. Given the dating and nature of the hiding place, archaeologists have identified them as the imperial insignia of Maxentius, hidden in a secret chamber by his followers to keep them out of Constantine’s hands.

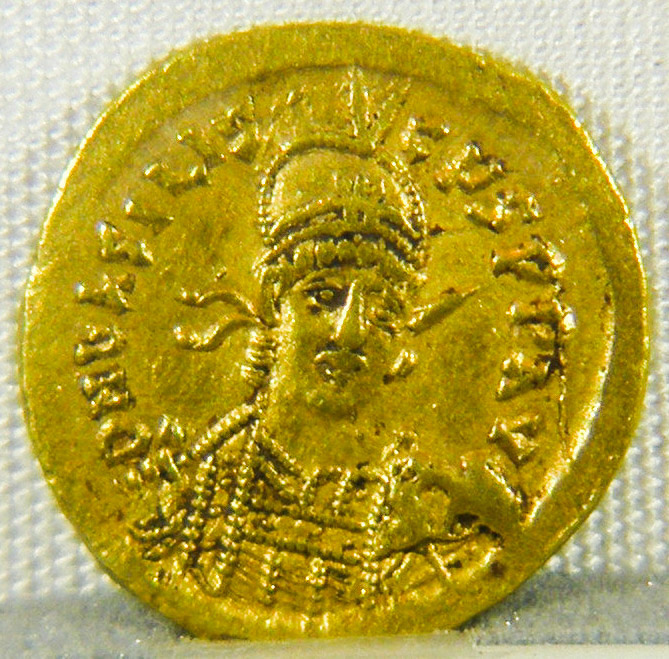
Coin of Basiliscus

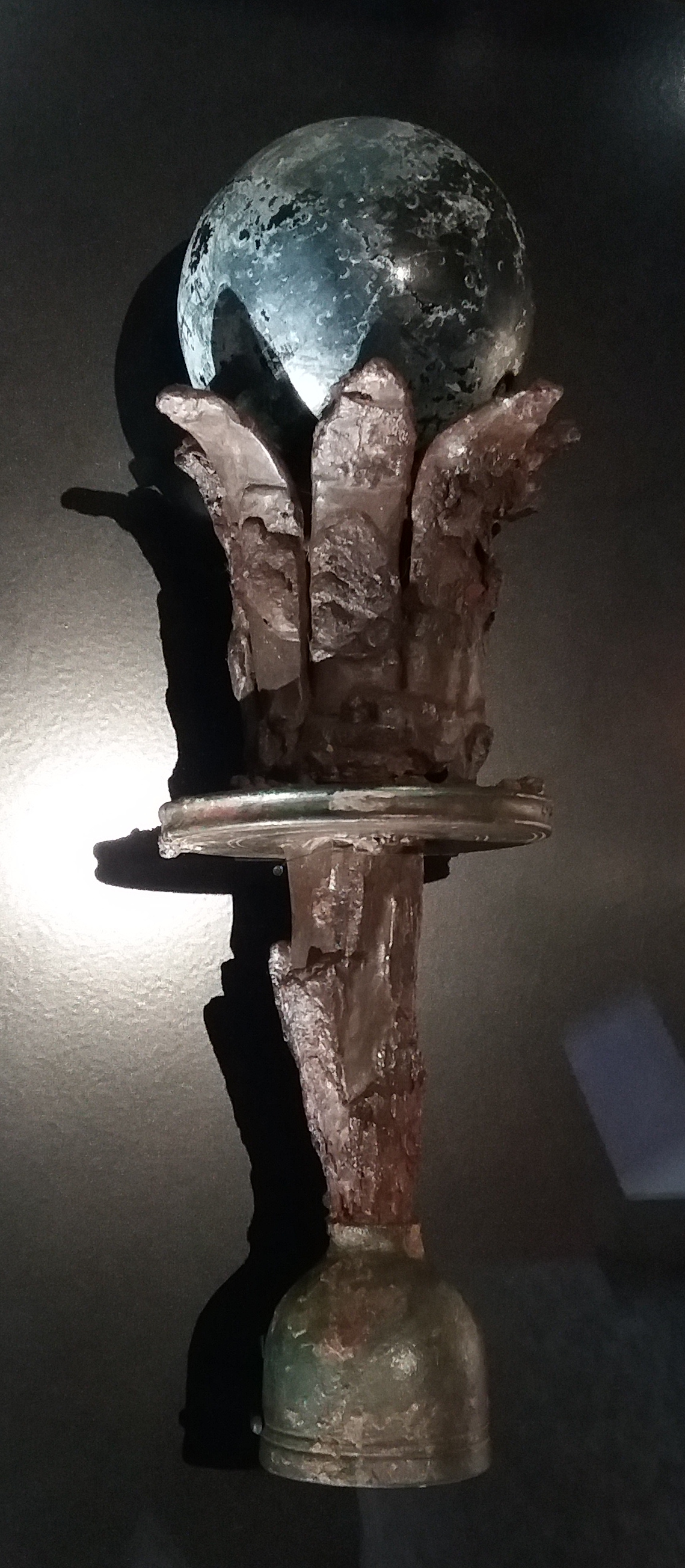
Sceptre with a chalcedony orb

== See also ==
- Museo Nazionale Romano

== Bibliography ==
Ancient sources

- Plutarch. Parallel Lives (in Ancient Greek). (Greek text and English translation).
- Suetonius. De vita Caesarum libri VIII (in Latin). (Latin text and Italian translation).

Modern historiographical sources

- Ranuccio Bianchi Bandinelli e Mario Torelli (1976). L'arte dell'antichità classica, Etruria-Roma. Torino: Utet.
- Eugenio La Rocca & M. Cima (1998). Horti romani. Ideologia e autorappresentazione. Atti del Convegno internazionale (Roma, 4-6 maggio 1995). Roma: L'Erma di Bretschneider. ISBN 978-88-8265-021-6.

Catalogs

- AA.VV. (2005). Adriano La Regina (ed.). Museo Nazionale Romano. Mondadori Electa.
- AA.VV. (1998). Adriano La Regina (ed.). Palazzo Massimo alle Terme. Mondadori Electa.
- AA.VV. (2013). Palazzo Massimo alle Terme. Le collezioni. Mondadori Electa. Archived from the original on 23 September 2015.
