= Prosper Barbot =

French painter (1798–1877)

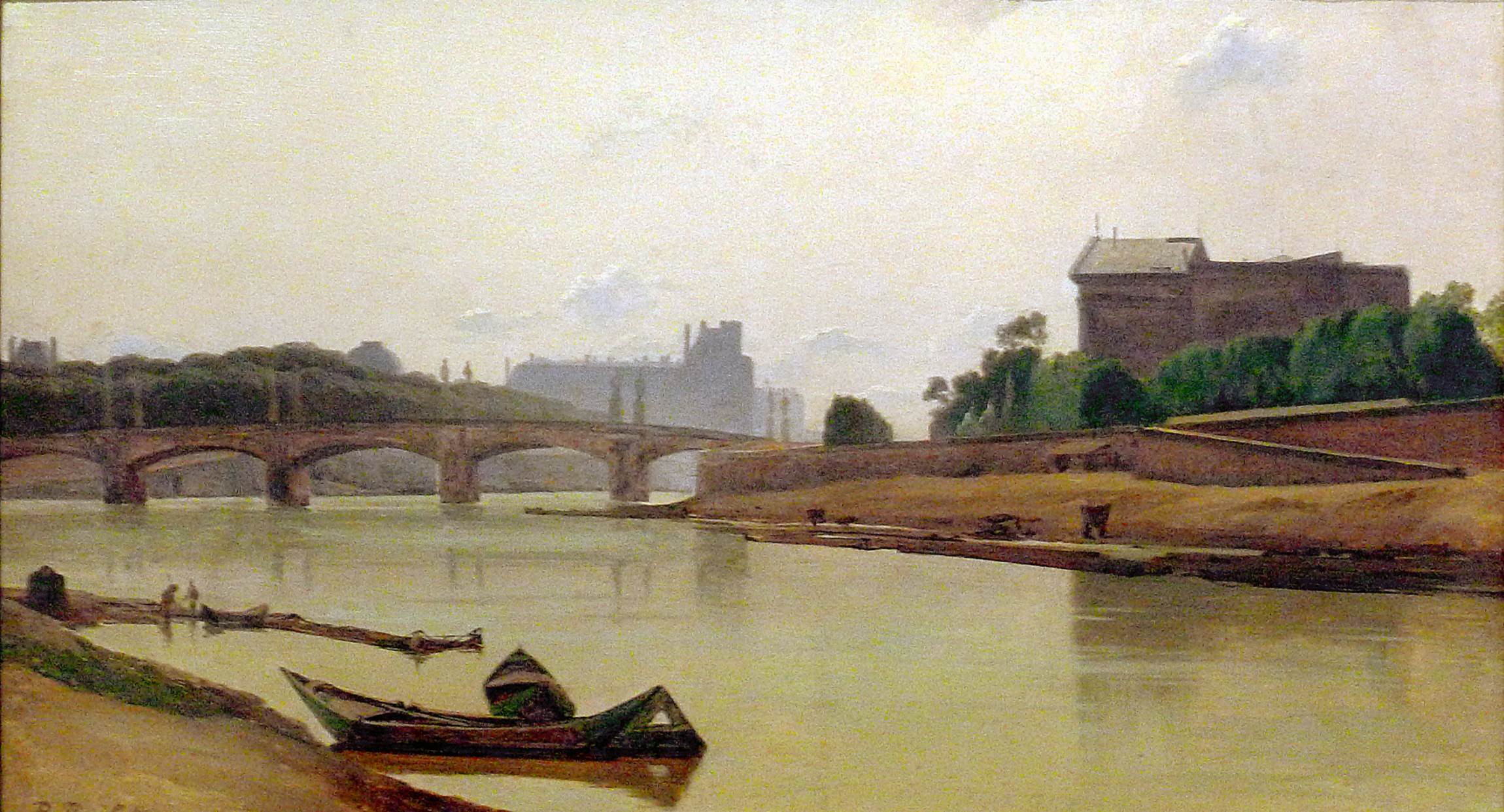
Pont de la Concorde (Paris)

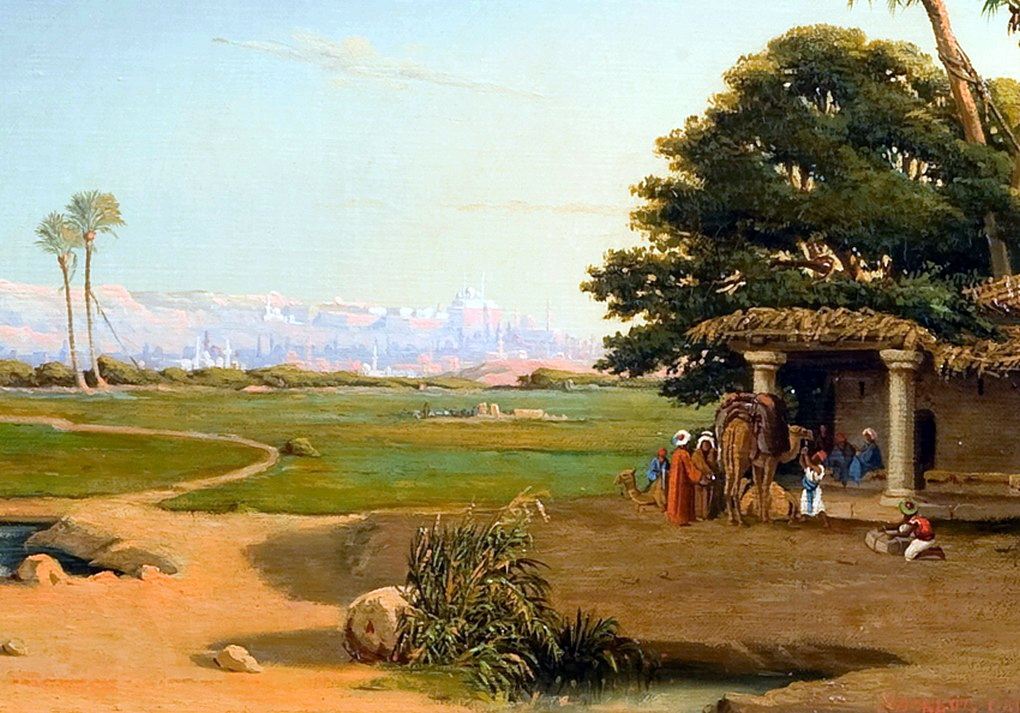
Oasis on the Road to Cairo

Prosper Barbot (French: [pʁɔspɛʁ baʁbo]; 21 May 1798, near Nantes - 12 October 1877, Chambellay) was a French landscape painter.

== Biography ==
His father worked for the Ministry of the Treasury. He studied painting in Paris, with Louis Étienne Watelet and Jules Coignet.

After 1824, he spent several years in Italy, where he met and worked with Jean-Baptiste Corot, Guillaume Bodinier and Louis Léopold Robert. Following a trip to Sicily, he submitted two paintings to the Académie des Beaux-Arts, View of the Ruins of Agrigento and View of the Roman Amphitheatre in Taormina, for which he received a gold medal. He returned to France in 1828 and settled in Chambellay, Maine-et-Loire, where he later became a Municipal Councilor.

He began exhibiting at the Salon of 1841, and would continue to do so on a regular basis until he became unable to paint. In 1842, he made a trip to Algeria, followed by a stay in Egypt from 1844 to 1846; bringing back numerous sketches, oils and watercolors on both occasions.

In 1933, his heirs donated a large number of his works to the Musée des Beaux-Arts d'Angers, including his two gold medal winners from Sicily. They are displayed in a gallery devoted to 19th century landscape painters. The Département des Arts Graphiques at the Louvre has a large set of his drawings.
