= Aufidia =

Aufidia can refer to:

- Aufidia gens, an ancient Roman gens
- the name once thought to belong to Alfidia, the mother of Roman empress Livia
