= Gnaeus Aufidius =

Gnaeus Aufidius may refer to:

- Gnaeus Aufidius (historian), politician, historian, and perhaps a jurist of the late 2nd and early 1st century BCE
- Gnaeus Aufidius (tribune 170 BC), nobleman of ancient Rome, who lived in the 2nd century BC

== See also ==
- Gnaeus Aufidius Orestes (died 1st century BC), Roman politician elected consul in 71 BC
