= Alfidia gens =

The Alfidia gens was a minor plebeian family of ancient Rome. Few members of this gens are known from history, of whom the most familiar may be Alfidia (Note: Suetonius erroneously calls her "Aufidia".) the mother of Livia, the first Roman empress. At least one of the Alfidii attained the consulship, Lucius Alfidius Herennianus in AD 171.

== Members ==
This list includes abbreviated praenomina. For an explanation of this practice, see filiation.

- Marcus Alfidius, the maternal grandfather of the empress Livia.
- Marcus M. f. Alfidius, maternal uncle of Livia.
- Alfidia M. f., the wife of Marcus Livius Drusus Claudianus and mother of Livia.
- Decimus Alfidius Hypsaeus, one of the aediles at Pompei in AD 2.
- Alfidius Sabinus, proconsul of Sicily some time in the 20s AD.
- Lucius Alfidius Herennianus, consul in AD 171, was the husband of Julia Calvina.
- Lucius Alfidius Urbanus, a second or third-century Hispano-Roman military officer of equestrian rank.

== See also ==
- List of Roman gentes

== Bibliography ==
- Klaus Zmeskal, Adfinitas: Die Verwandtschaften der senatorischen Führungsschicht der römischen Republik von 218–31 v. Chr (Adfinity: Kinship of the Senatorial Elite of the Roman State from AD 218 to 231), vol. 1, Karl Stutz Verlag (2009), ISBN 9783888493041.
