= Aufidius =

Aufidius may refer to:

- the nomen (family name) of any Roman man of the gens Aufidia (see for a list)
- Attius Tullus Aufidius, a leader of the Volsci and a character from Shakespeare's play Coriolanus
