= Sodales Augustales =

Ancient Roman priestly order

The Sodales or Sacerdotes Augustales (singular Sodalis or Sacerdos Augustalis), or simply Augustales, were an order (sodalitas) of Roman priests originally instituted by Tiberius to attend to the maintenance of the cult of Augustus and the Julii. Their establishment in 14 AD is described in the Annales of Tacitus. Their membership and organisation was very different from that of the Augustales or seviri Augustales, found throughout the cities and towns of the western Roman empire and usually selected by town councilors. Up to 95% of attested seviri Augustales were freedmen. Many were members of professional associations, not invariably wealthy but still respectable, acting as benefactors to their communities and the State by funding public gifts (munera), such as entertainments, new buildings and distribution of the Cura Annonae (annona or grain dole).

In Rome, the twenty one sodales were chosen by lot from among the aristocracy, to which were added Tiberius, Drusus, Claudius, and Germanicus, as members of the imperial family. Women might be appointed priestesses of Augustus, a practice probably originating in the appointment of Livia by a decree of the Senate as priestess to her deceased husband. A flamen could also be a member of the Augustales. These senatorial sodales Augustales were very different from the municipal seviri Augustales, as Linderski put it: “two vastly dissimilar organizations sharing a similar name”. Related to the sodales Augustales were lesser known priesthoods that maintained the cults to deceased, deified emperors, each of whom had their own dedicated sodality.

== See also ==
- Titii
- Sodalitas
