= Rogation (disambiguation) =

Rogation may refer to:

- Rogation days, as marked on the Christian calendar of the Western Church
- Rogatio, the constitutional procedure by which a bill became law in ancient Rome
- Rogation of the Ninevites, seventy days before Easter in the East Syriac Rite
- Lex Publilia (471 BC), a law also known as the Publilian Rogation
- Lex Licinia Sextia, a series of laws lso known as the Licinian Rogations (368 BC)

== See also ==
- Rogationists
