= Marcus Aufidius Lurco =

Tribune of the plebs 61 BC

Marcus Aufidius Lurco also known simply as Aufidius Lurco, was a Roman plebeian tribune who lived in the 1st century BC. Lurco was a member of the gens Aufidia, a plebeian family that appeared in the Roman Republic and Roman Empire. They became a family of consular rank. Lurco originally came from Fundi (modern Fondi, Italy).

In the past he was mistakenly identified as the maternal grandfather of empress Livia.

== High office ==
According to Suetonius, Lurco held a high office at Rome. In 61 BC, he was plebeian tribune. During his tribunate he passed the lex Aufidia de ambitu. The lex Aufidia concerned bribery in Roman assemblies: if a candidate, promised and paid money to a tribe at the comitia, he should pay yearly 3,000 sesterces during his life. However, if the candidate, merely promised and did not pay, the candidate should be exempt. This caused a witted argument between Lurco and Publius Clodius Pulcher.

Lurco in 59 BC, was one of the defence witnesses at the trial of Lucius Valerius Flaccus. Between 52 and 51 BC, Lurco prosecuted and procured, for the acts of violence, the conviction of Sextus Clodius Pulcher for bringing the corpse of Publius Clodius Pulcher into the Curia Julia.

== Personal life ==
Lurco was the first person in Rome to fatten peacocks (see peafowl) for sale and from this he became wealthy.

== Research ==
It was in the past believed that he was the father of a daughter named Aufidia who became the mother of empress Livia Drusilla. But this is no longer accepted, as inscription shows that Livia's mother's name was Alfidia.

== Sources ==
- Suetonius, The Twelve Caesars, Caligula
