= Rogatio Aufidia de ambitu =

The rogatio Aufidia de ambitu, sometimes referred to as the lex Aufidia de ambitu, was a proposed Roman law, aimed at punishing electoral bribery, ambitus. It is known from a letter of Cicero to Atticus, and was put forward by Marcus Aufidius Lurco as tribune of the plebs in 61 BC. The rogatio was passed by the Senate, but was not voted on by the Roman people.

== Background ==
Corruption was endemic in Republican Roman politics and many attempts were made to restrict bribery.

== Provisions ==
The proposed law had some extreme suggestions. A candidate who promised money to a tribe but did not pay it was to go unpunished, however, one who did follow through with the bribe was to pay each tribe 3000 sesterces annually as long as he lived.

== See also ==
- Electoral fraud
- List of Roman laws
- Roman Law
