= The Death of Tatius =

Painting by Anne-Louis Girodet de Roussy-Trioson

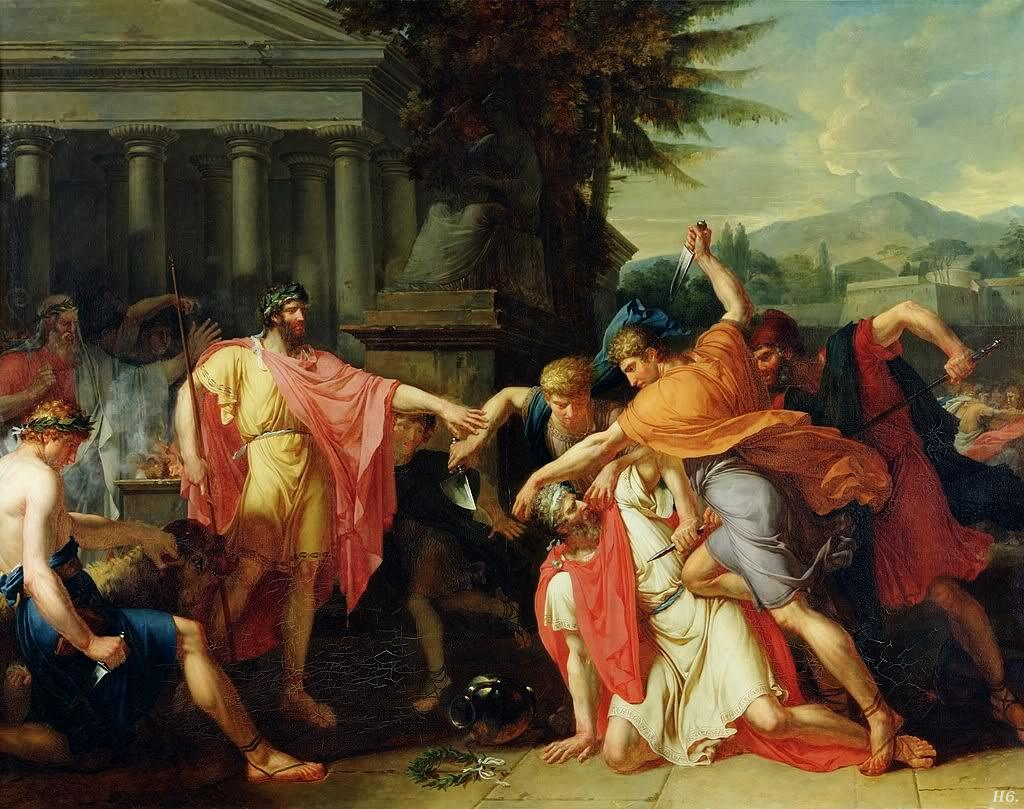
- Artist: Anne-Louis Girodet de Roussy-Trioson
- Year: 1788
- Type: Oil on canvas, history painting
- Dimensions: 113.5 cm × 147 cm (44.7 in × 58 in)
- Location: Musée des Beaux-Arts, Angers

The Death of Tatius (French: La mort de Tatius) is a 1788 history painting by the French artist Anne-Louis Girodet. Produced the year before the French Revolution, it is in the Neoclassical style. It is based on the mythical story of the Founding of Rome. It depicts the death of Titus Tatius, leader of the Sabines, while waging war against Romulus. It was entered in the Prix de Rome in 1788. Although Girodet failed to win that year, in 1789 he won the competition with Joseph and His Brethren. Today it is in the collection of the Musée des Beaux-Arts in Angers.

== Bibliography ==
- Levitine, George. Girodet-Trioson: An Iconographical Study. Garland, 1978.
