= Titus Tatius =

King of the Sabines in Roman mythology

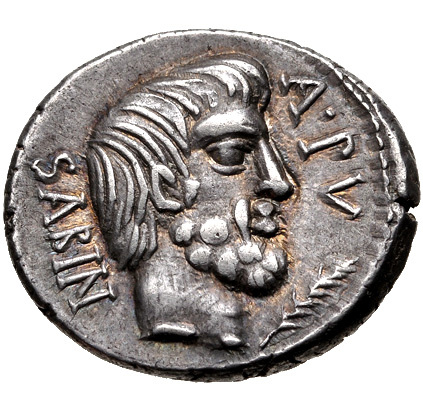
- A Roman Republican denarii, minted by Lucius Titurius Sabinus in 89 BC. The Sabine king Titus Tatius is portrayed on the obverse.

Co-King of Rome
- Reign: 745–740 BC (traditional dates)
- With: Romulus

King of the Sabines
- Reign: unknown–740 BC
- Predecessor: unknown
- Successor: Romulus as sole king
- Died: 740 BC; Lavinium
- Issue: a daughter and a son

According to the Roman foundation myth, Titus Tatius, also called Tatius Sabinus, was king of the Sabines from Cures and joint-ruler of the Kingdom of Rome for several years.

During the reign of Romulus, the first king of Rome, Tatius declared war on Rome in response to the incident known as the rape of the Sabine Women. After he captured the stronghold atop the Capitoline Hill through the treachery of Tarpeia, the Sabines and Romans fought an epic battle that concluded when the abducted Sabine women intervened to convince the two sides to reconcile and end the war. The two kingdoms were joined and the two kings ruled jointly until Tatius' murder five years later. The joint kingdom was still called Rome and the citizens of the city were still called Romans, but as a community, they were to be called Quirites. The Sabines were integrated into the existing tribes and curies, yet Tatius is not counted as one of the traditional "Seven Kings of Rome".

Tatius had one daughter, Tatia, who married Numa Pompilius (Romulus' successor), and one son, who was the ancestor of the patrician Tatii family.

== War with Rome ==
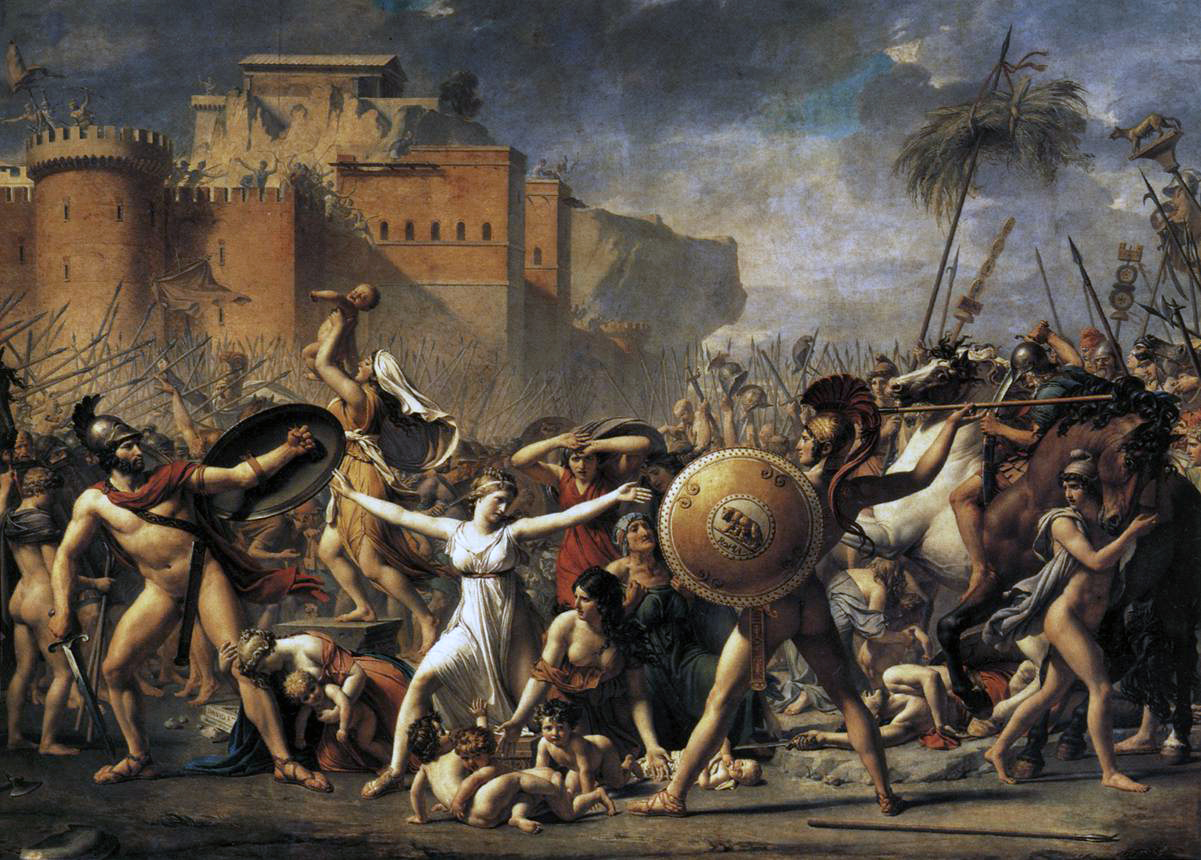
Jacques-Louis David: The Intervention of the Sabine Women, 1799; Titus Tatius at left

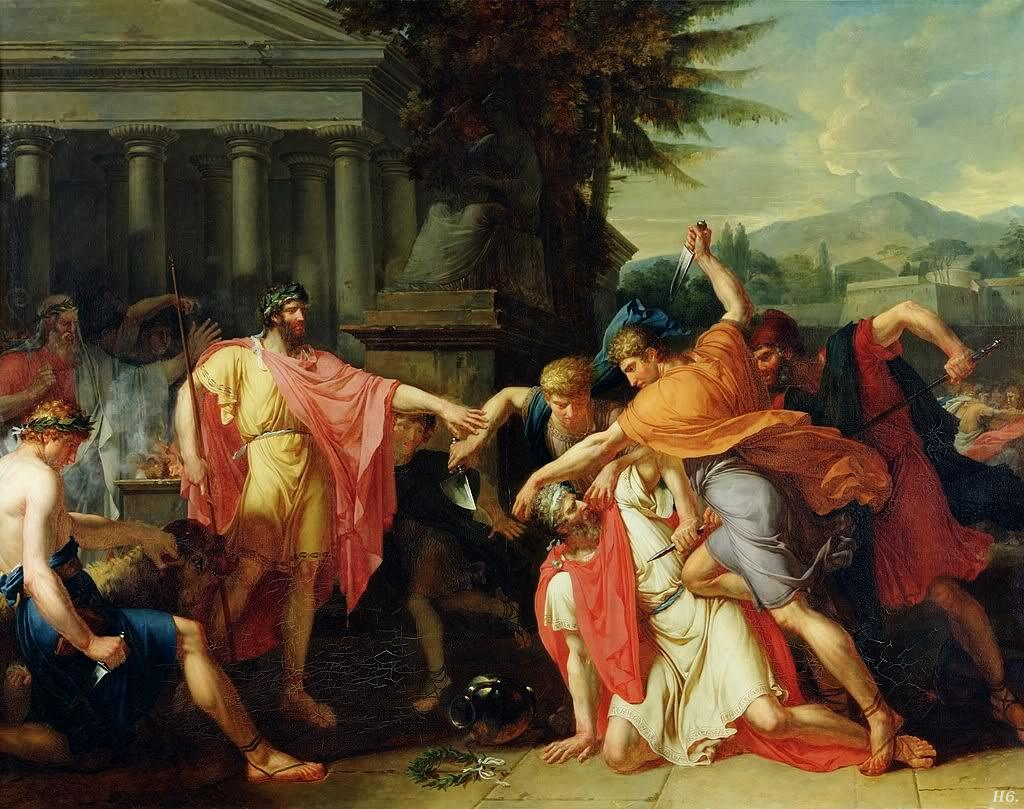
The Death of Tatius by Girodet, 1788

Dionysius of Halicarnassus (c. 60 BC – after 7 BC) reports that after a year of preparation, Rome and the Sabines engaged in several skirmishes and minor engagements before fighting two major battles. Two days after the first battle, the second and final battle between them took place in between the two Roman hills they were occupying. It was an epic contest, featuring multiple reversals wherein each army had, and then lost the upper hand. At the end of the day, the Sabines retreated to the citadel and the Romans didn't pursue them.

Before combat could be resumed, the Sabine women, some in funerary attire, some carrying their children with them, convinced Tatius and Romulus to end the fighting. After a ceasefire, the nations signed a treaty creating a single kingdom under the joint rule of both kings, who reigned together until the death of Tatius.

== Death ==
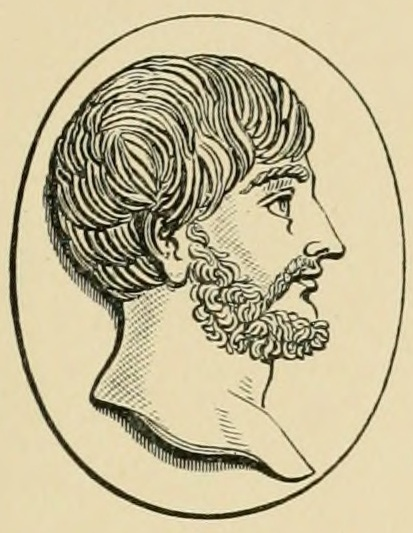
Tatius Sabinus, after engraved sard

The two kings together oversaw an expansion of Rome and the building of several landmarks, as well as the conquest of Cameria. Their first disagreement came in the sixth year of their reign. Dionysius relates that some of Tatius' friends had victimized some Laurentii and when the city sent ambassadors to demand justice, Tatius would not allow Romulus to hand over the perpetrators. After the ambassadors had left for home, a group of Sabines waylaid them as they slept. Some escaped and when word got back to Rome, Romulus promptly arrested and surrendered the men responsible – including a member of Tatius' own family – over to a new group of ambassadors. Tatius followed the group out of the city and freed the accused men by force. Later, while both kings were participating in a sacrifice in Lavinium, he was killed in retribution.

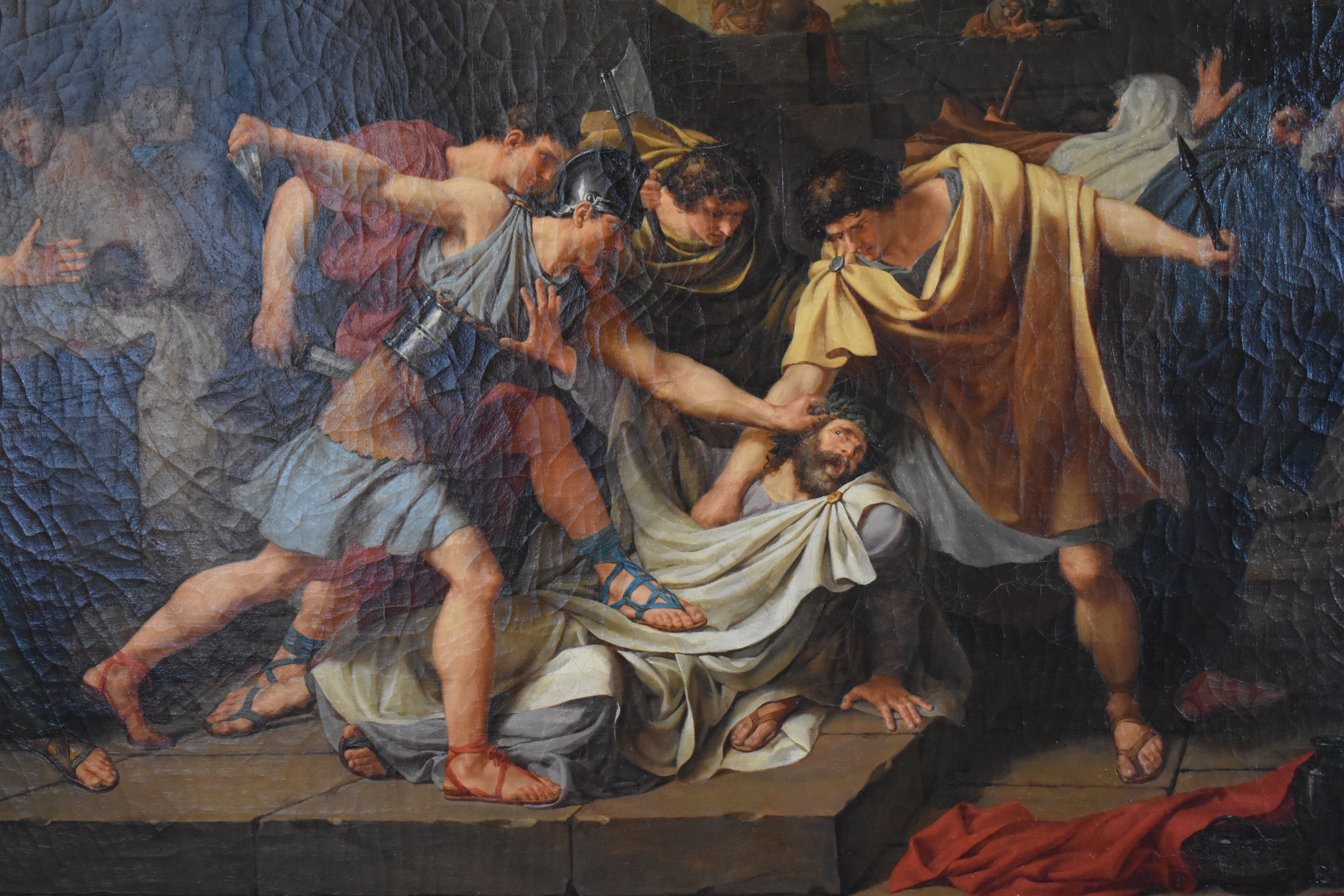
The Death of Tatius, Jacques Réattu

Dionysius also tells the account of Licinius Macer, wherein Tatius was killed when he went alone to try to convince the victims in Lavinium to forgive the crimes committed. When they discovered he had not brought the men responsible with him, as the senate and Romulus had ordered, an angry mob stoned him to death.

== History ==
According to Theodor Mommsen, the story of Tatius' death seems to be a legend explaining the abolition of blood-revenge, presented as-if it were actual history, and that Tatius, who in some respects resembles Remus, is not a historical personage, but the eponymous hero of the religious college called Sodales Titii. The members of the sodales were bound to offer a yearly sacrifice at Tatius' grave; all of its members were of senatorial rank. In two different books, Tacitus expresses two different opinions, which Mommsen interprets as representing two different traditions:

- That either it was instituted by Tatius himself to preserve a Sabine cult in Rome; or
- That it was instituted by Romulus in honour of Tatius.

The Titii had fallen into abeyance by the end of the republic, but were revived by emperor Augustus and existed to the end of the 2nd century CE. Augustus himself, and the emperor Claudius belonged to the college. Varro mentions him as a king of Rome who enlarged the city and established certain cults, but he may just have been the eponym of the tribe Titiae, or even an invention to serve as a precedent for collegial magistracy.

Gary Forsythe suggests instead, that Titus Tatius could well have been the first real king of Rome, who was later replaced in the accepted narrative by an unhistorical Romulus and Remus, whose names have been construed to derive from that of the city itself.
