= Titus Aufidius (physician) =

1st-century BCE Roman physician

Titus Aufidius was a physician of ancient Rome, of the Aufidia gens. He was a native of Sicily and a pupil of Greek physician Asclepiades of Bithynia, and therefore lived in the first century BCE.

He is probably the same person who is quoted by Caelius Aurelianus by the name of "Titus" only, and who wrote a work called On the Soul and another On Chronic Diseases, consisting of at least two books.
