= Titii =

College of Roman priests

The Titii (or Titii sodales, later Titienses, Sacerdotes Titiales Flaviales) was a college (sodalitas) of Roman priests.

== Origins ==
There are two versions of how the college was established. One credits Titus Tatius with creating the college to superintend and preserve the Titienses, one of the three original tribes (tribus) in the Regal period, which may have represented the Italic tribe of Sabines. The other says that Romulus created it in honour of king Tatius, who after his death was worshipped as a god.

== History ==
During the Republic the Titii are no longer mentioned, as the cults of all Italic tribes became gradually united into Roman religion. The Titii were restored under the Empire, but their functions were changed to conduct the worship of an emperor, like those of Sodales Augustales. Augustus may have been a member of the Titii.
