= Musée des Beaux-Arts d'Angers =

Art gallery and museum in Angers, France

Musée des beaux-arts d'Angers
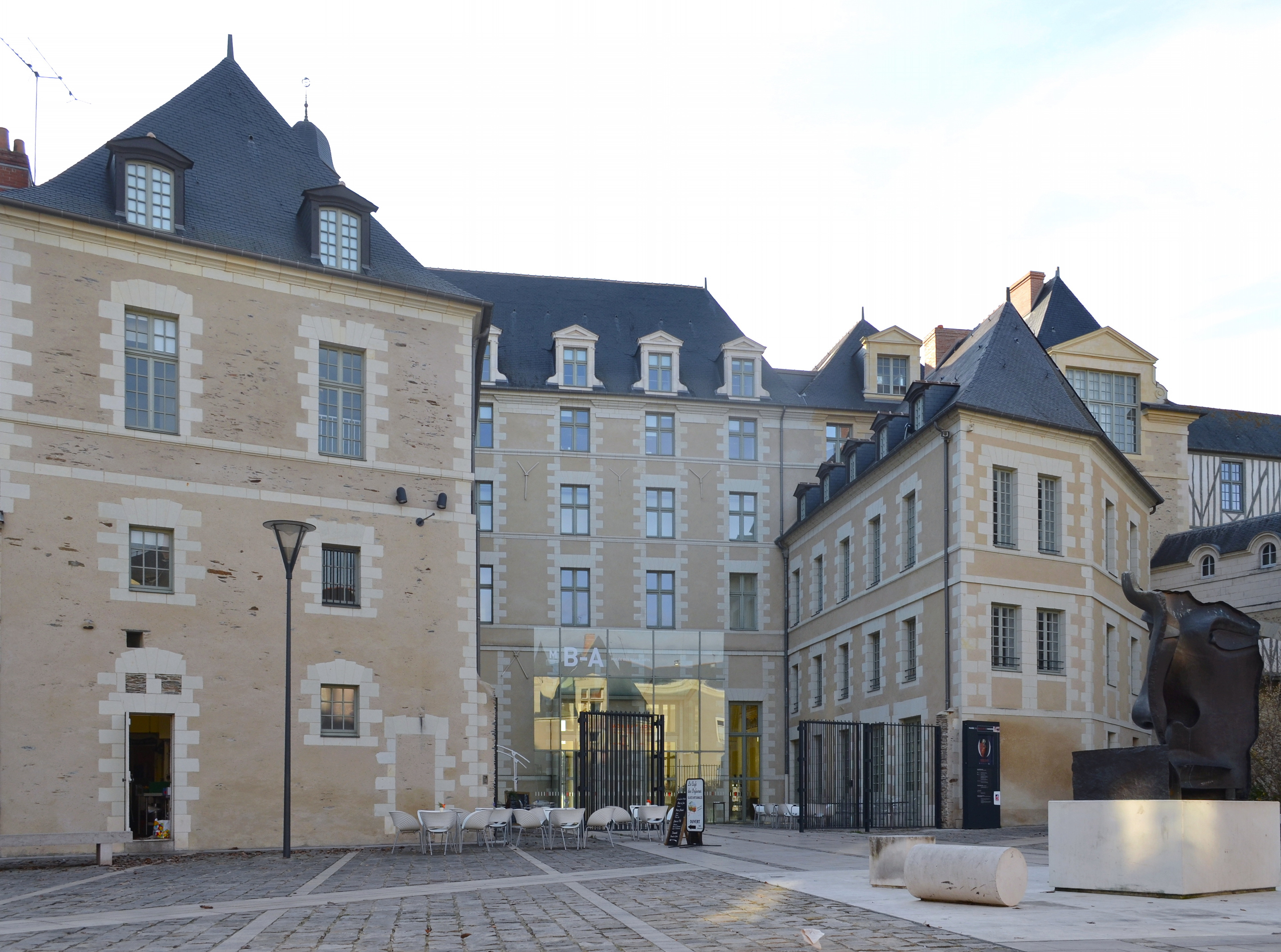
- Musée des Beaux-Arts is in Logis Barrault

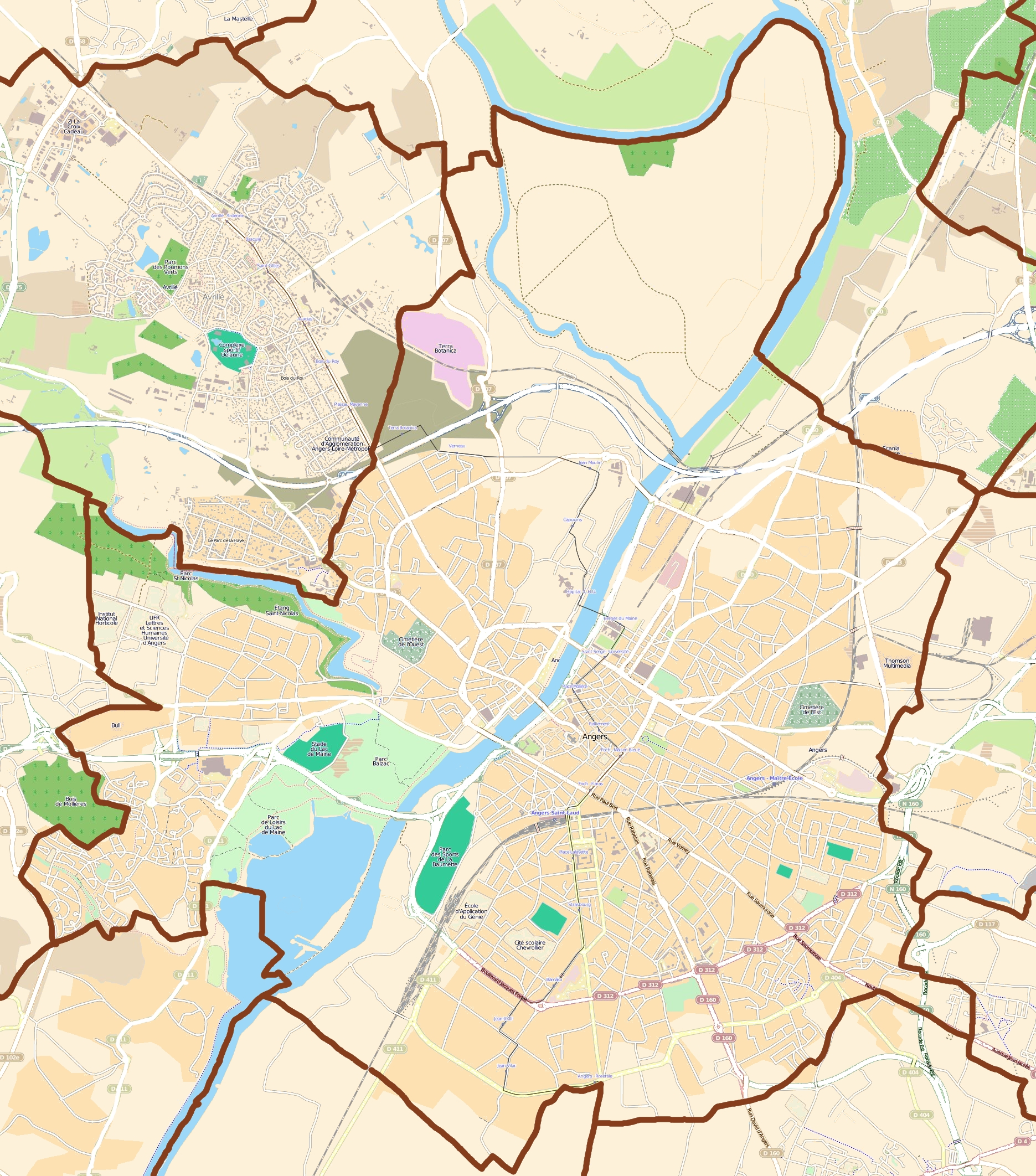
- Location in France
- Established: 1801
- Location: Angers, France
- Coordinates: 47.46889°N 0.55472°W
- Type: Fine arts
- Collection size: Paintings, sculpture, drawings etc.
- Website: musees.angers.fr

The Musée des beaux-arts d'Angers is a museum of art located in a mansion, the "logis Barrault", place Saint-Éloi near the historic city of Angers, western France.

== Building ==
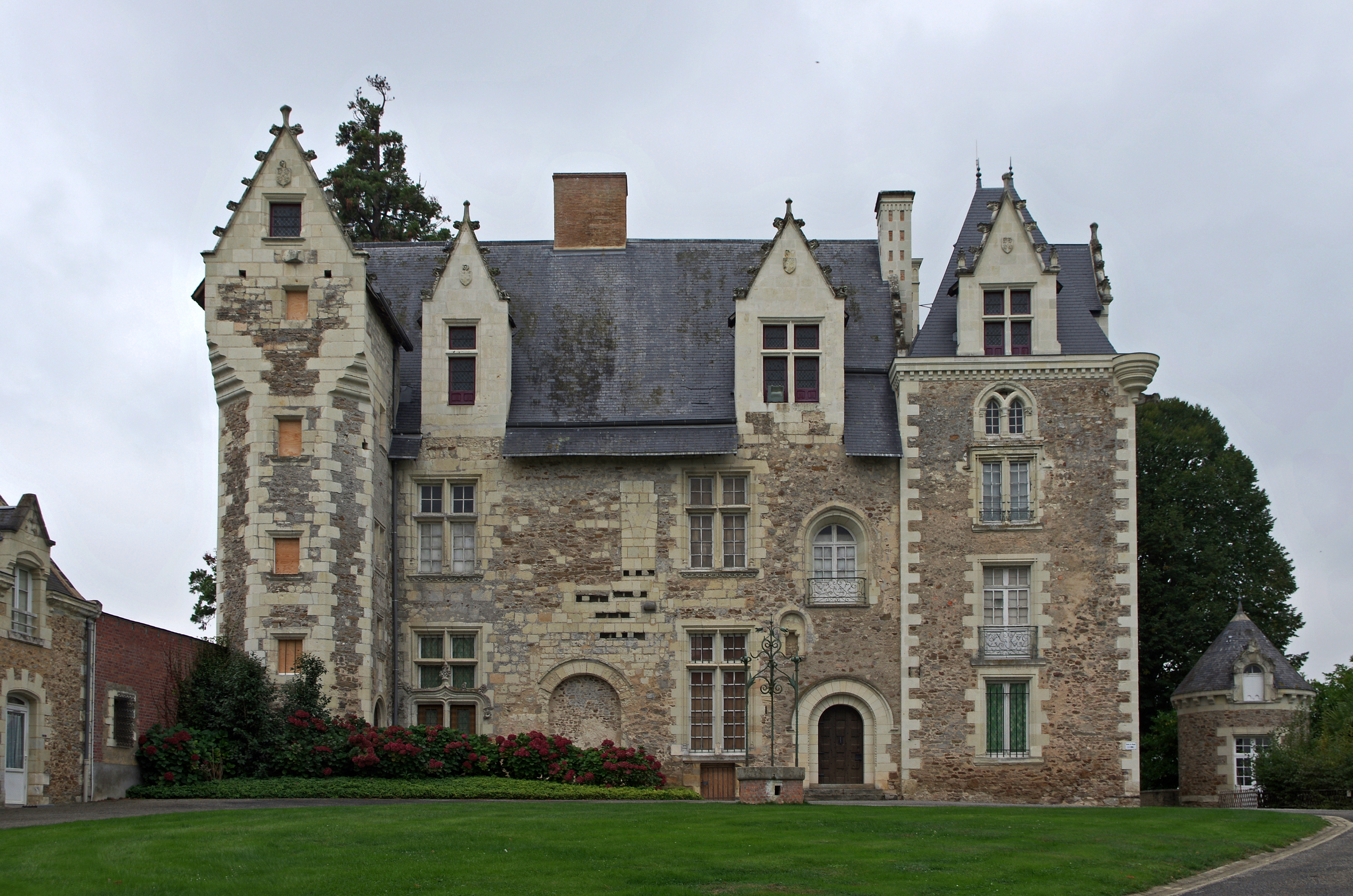
Château de Villevêque, an extension of the museum

The museum is part of the Toussaint complex, which includes the garden of Fine Arts, the David d'Angers gallery, the city library and the canteen. It displays a rich collection of art works acquired over the centuries on a total area of 7,000 square metres (75,000 sq ft) distributed as follows:

- 2,500 square metres (27,000 sq ft) for permanent collections
- 500 square metres (5,400 sq ft) for temporary exhibitions
- 1,000 square metres (11,000 sq ft) for the public reception areas: lobbies, passing museums, auditorium, video room, coffee shop ...
- 3,000 square metres (32,000 sq ft) for technical buildings

Thanks to recent restoration the site combines history and development with the most modern presentation. The museum has been classified by the Journal des Arts Museum on 2010 as the best of western France and fourth museum in France (outside Paris). This ranking is due to a redesign of the museum's website and the richness and diversity of the exhibitions.

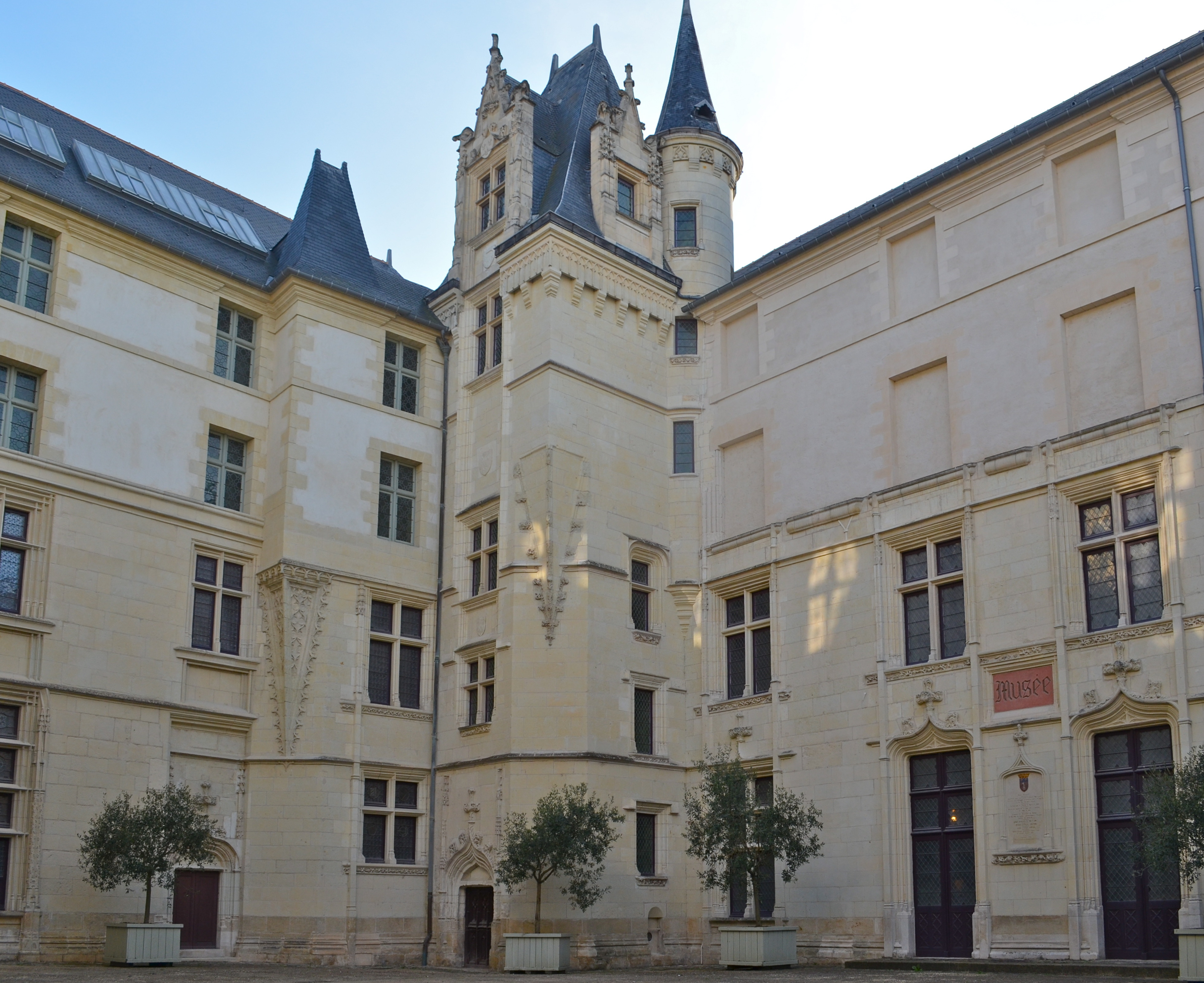
The Logis Barrault

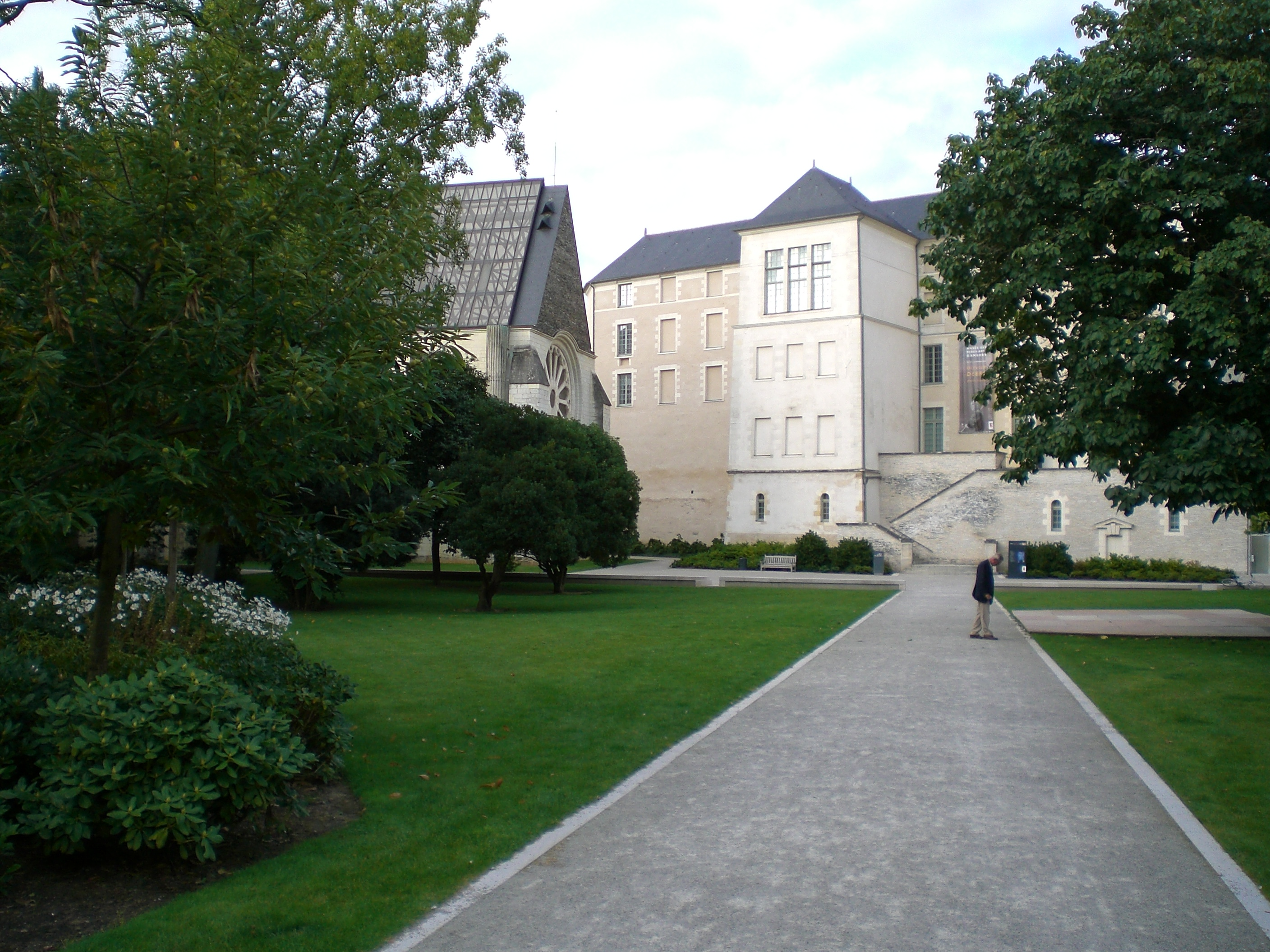
Alley in the compound

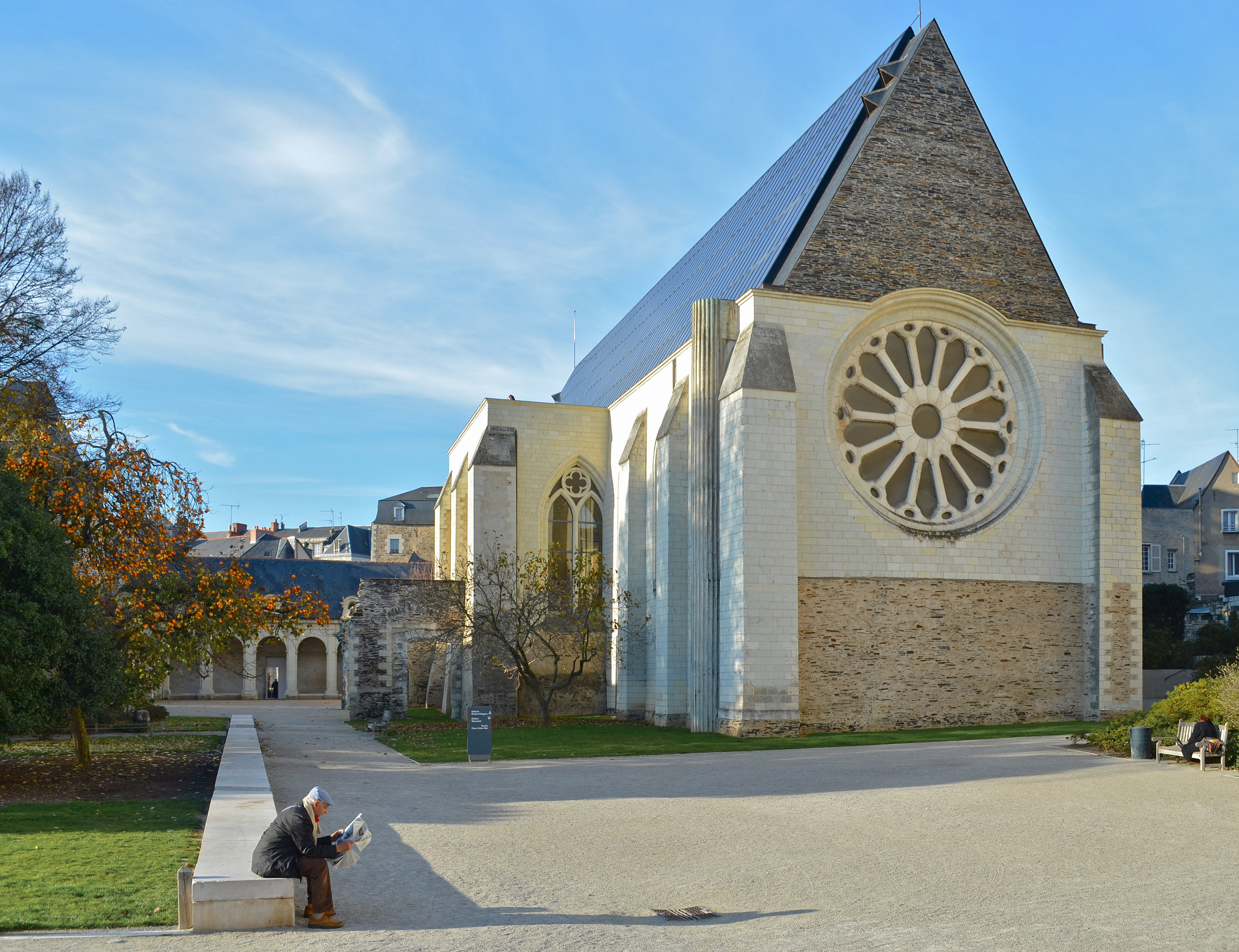
The church of the former Abbaye of Toussaint

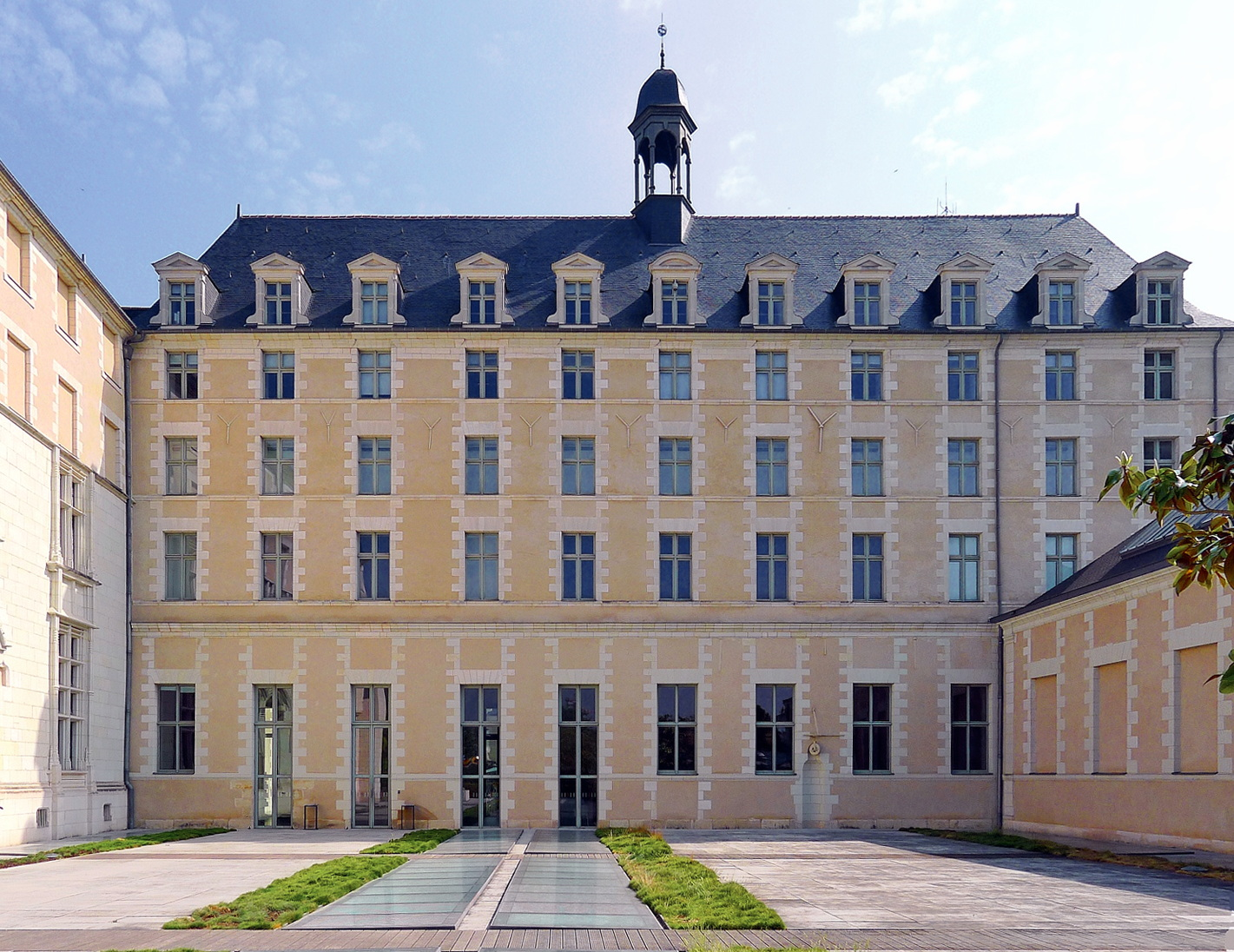
Former refectory of the priest seminary

== History ==
After the French Revolution, the Directory founded "Ecole Centrales" (central schools), and that of Maine-et-Loire was transferred to the Logis Barrault mansion. In May 1801, the museum of the Ecole Centrale de Maine-et-Loire opened its doors, modeled on the Louvre. In 1803, the Central Schools were closed, but the municipality of Angers decided to preserve the museum of painting. The natural history museum and municipal library opened in 1805. The museum is considered to be one of the richest in all the neighboring departments, and after that of Paris it would be one of the finest in France. In the two centuries that followed the museum came to have a critical lack of space and obsolete facilities, but this did not prevent the museum from receiving regular bequests and prestigious gifts, including those of Pierre-Jean David, called David d'Angers.

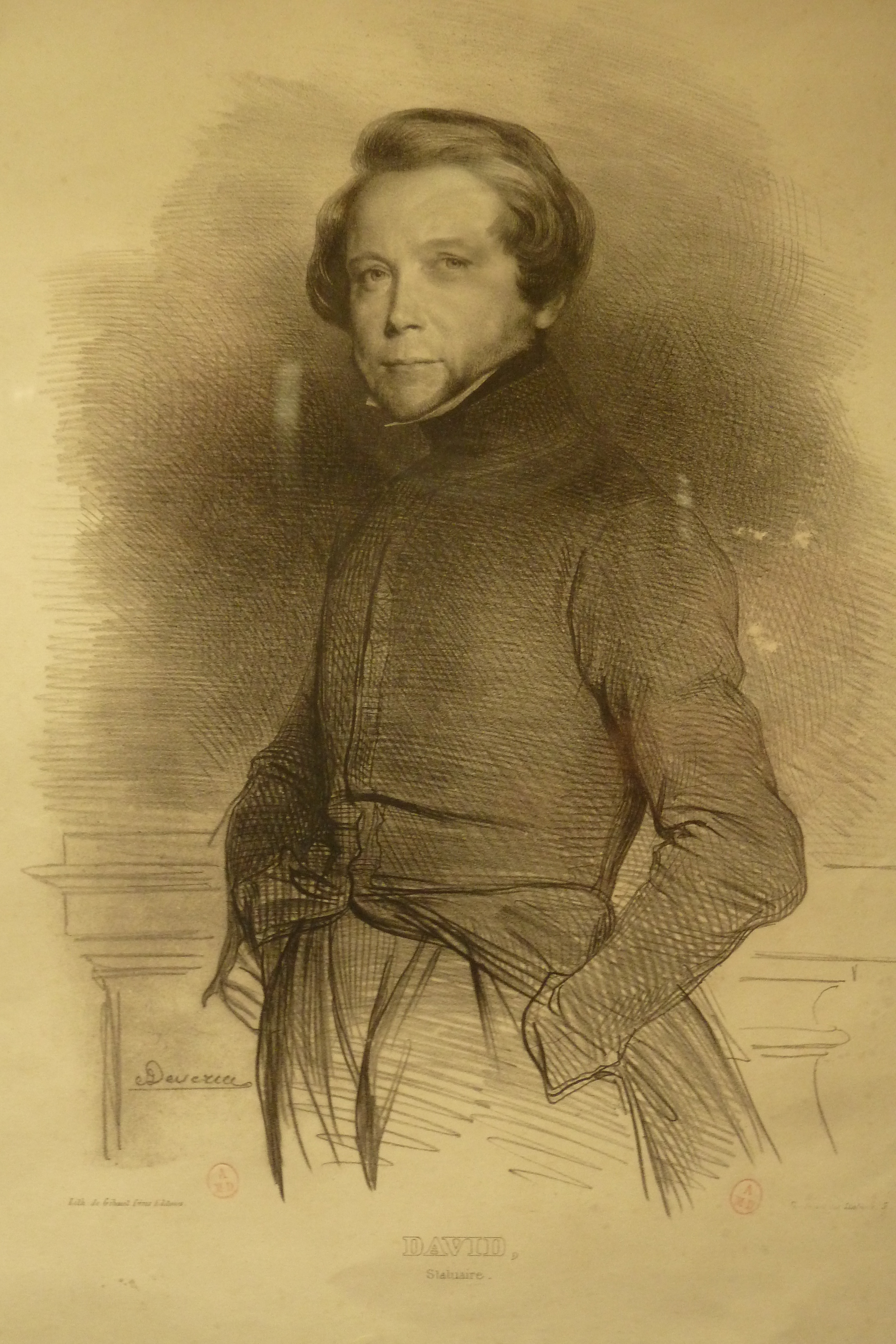
Portrait of David d'Angers at the age of 50, Achille Devéria, 1838 (Cleveland Museum of Art)

In 1839 the David d'Angers Gallery was inaugurated in the former refectory of the museum (where it remained until 1984). In 1859, Lancelot-Théodore Turpin de Crissé enriched the museum's collection with a considerable legacy: Egyptian, Greek and Roman antiques, ancient bronzes, Greek vases, glasses, enamels and pottery, as well as many paintings including some by Jean Auguste Dominique Ingres (Paolo and Francesca) and some primitives including a triptych of the School of Avignon. He had built up a collection that reflected the eclectic tastes of the Restoration, with an estimated total value of nearly one million francs at the time. In 1861 the painter Guillaume Bodinier offered the city the hôtel Pincé - musée Pincé - to house the objects of the Turpin de Crissé collection. In 1887 the Beaurepaire gallery was inaugurated, built perpendicularly to the David d'Angers gallery and designed by city architect Charles Demoget. Works presented included The Dance, a controversial sculpture by Charles Gumery, and The Death of Priam by Pierre-Narcisse Guérin.

At the beginning of twentieth century expansion projects were initiated. A new public entrance appeared in order to make the museum more visible. But the project fails. In 1944 the museum is devastated by the war and was placed, two years later, on the list of classified provincial museums. From 1949 the museum was hastily reorganized, and reopened in 1950. The Conservators had to adapt to the constraints of the site without being able to really enhance the collections. In 1977 the City foresaw a redevelopment of the Museum of Fine Arts. In 1980 it was decided to first move the library, and then to transfer the David d'Angers gallery to the Church of All Saints Abbey of Angers. In 1984 François Mitterrand inaugurated the new David d'Angers gallery. In 1998 the City approved the scientific and cultural project presented by Patrick Nouëne, Director and Chief Curator of the Museums of Angers.

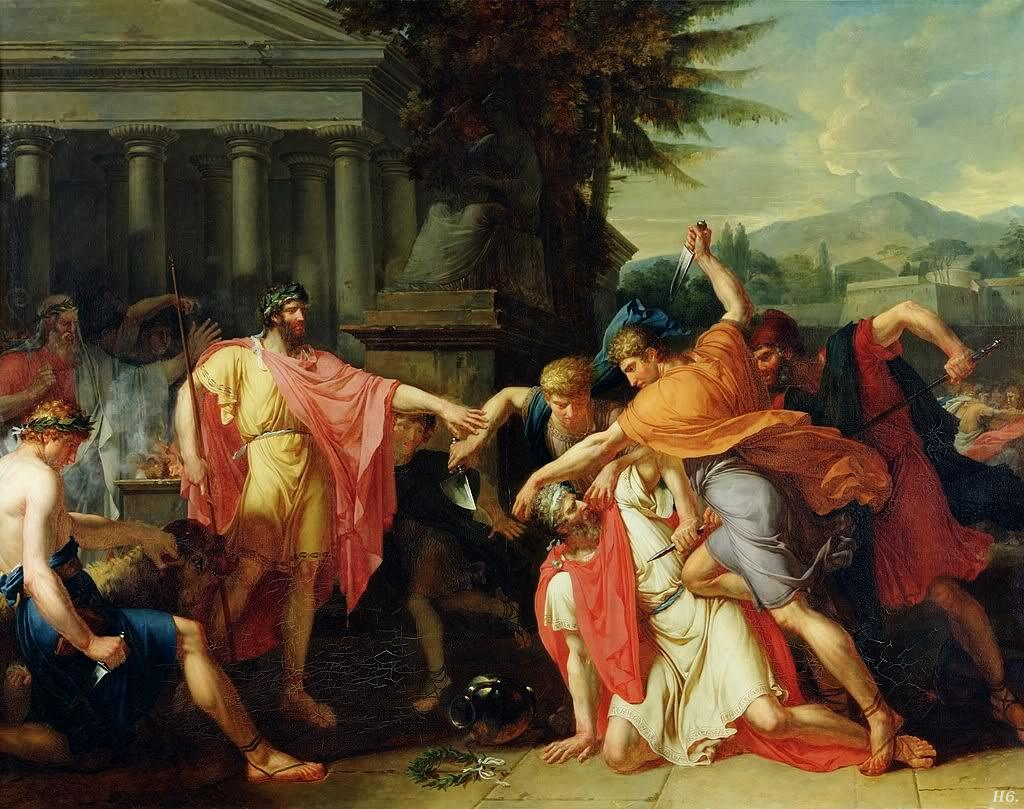
The Death of Tatius by Girodet, 1788

Between 1999 and 2004 massive renovations, transformation and enlargement were orchestrated by two famous architects:

- Gabor Mester de Parajd, Chief Architect of Historic Monuments, had already completed several major projects in Maine-et-Loire, the Cathedral of St. Maurice d'Angers and the Abbey of Fontevraud. He took charge of the restoration of the heritage listed logis Barrault and the old parts, in the purest respect of architectural and historical references. "The Museum of Fine Arts is a jumble of styles and constructions. Our aim was to enhance the identity of every age and harmonize all the buildings. On the facades, we wanted to preserve the authentic rather than hiring a new restoration. Intramural, some tinkering done over the centuries led us to conduct historical studies and many soundings. We had to takeaccount of discoveries made at the site. For example, we replaced the vaulted loggia, one of the peculiarities of the house Barrault."
- Antoine Stinco (museographer architect) who participated in the creation of the Museum of Modern and Contemporary Art of Toulouse and the National Gallery of Jeu de Paume in Paris. For the Museum of Fine Arts in Angers, he devoted himself to the renovation of the most recent additions, to create entirely new spaces. "My first goal was to stage a lively place that facilitates the discovery and fosters curiosity of audiences. I'm not trying to copy the past using the same architectural style. My mission was to create new spaces in relation to their function."

In 2003 the city of Angers received, by bequest of its last owner and contributor, Mr. Daniel Duclaux, the Villevêque castle and the extensive collection of art objects it contains. Among this rich collection of over 900 works, hundreds of pieces of antique furniture, some sixty old books, manuscripts and incunabula, Italian ceramics and Hispano-Moorish enamels of Limousin, 70 works of art, sculptures in stone or polychrome wood from the Middle Ageas, tapestries from Flanders in the Renaissance period. The same year the Musée-Château de Villevêque was opened to the public, attached to the Angers Museum of Fine Arts.

== Permanent collections ==
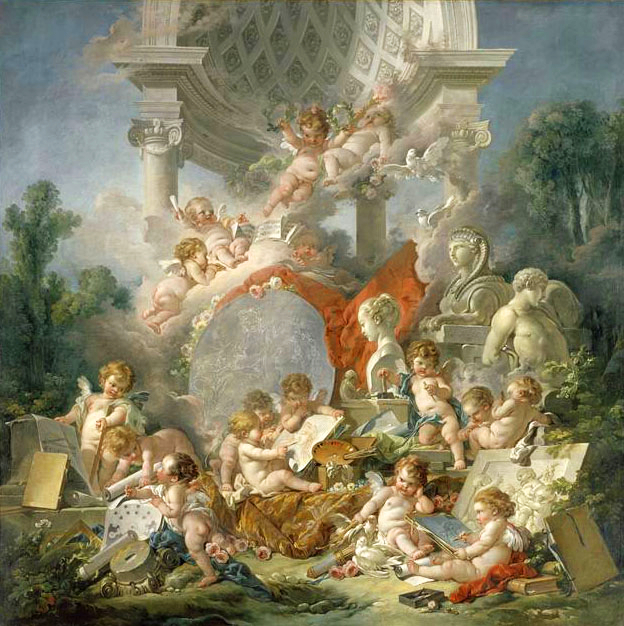
Les Génies des Arts by François Boucher (1703-1770)

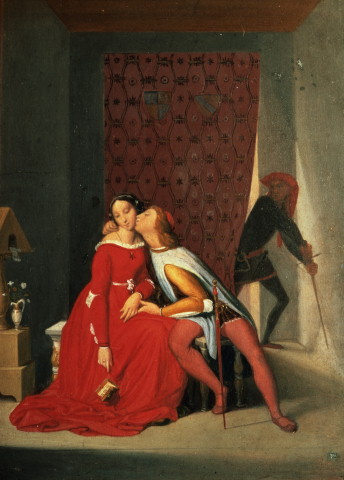
Gianciotto Discovers Paolo and Francesca by Jean Auguste Dominique Ingres (1780–1867)

Works from many gifts, bequests, deposits or acquisitions are located in the historic rooms of the museum. 900 of them are exposed on the 1700 account as the Museum of Fine Arts. About 150 underwent fundamental restoration during construction. They are divided into two separate permanent tours:

=== The "fine art" tour ===
This tour presents a rich collection of paintings punctuated by artwork and sculptures that tells chronologically the different artistic movements from the fourteenth to the twenty first centuries. Two rooms on the first floor, restored by the Historic Buildings society, are devoted to 14th-century Primitives (French, Italian and Flemish) and objects of art from the late Middle Ages and Renaissance, but also to Northern, French and Italian schools of the 16th and 17th centuries. These rooms hold works of Segna di Bonaventura, Benvenuto Tisi, Jehan Bellegambe, Jan Brueghel the Elder, Hendrick van Balen, Frans Franken, Jacob Jordaens (Self Portrait), Nicolaes Pieterszoon Berchem, Jan Asselijn, Jan van Kessel, Willem van Mieris, Jacob van Ruisdael, Theodoor van Thulden, Jacob Foppens van Es, David Teniers the Younger, Philippe de Champaigne, Charles Le Brun, Charles de La Fosse, Jacques Stella, Pierre Mignard, Antoine Coypel, Sisto Badalocchio, Pier Francesco Mola, Giovanni Battista Vanni, Lorenzo Lippi (Allegory of the simulation), Luca Giordano, Francesco Solimena, Francesco Guardi and of Giambattista Tiepolo with his famous Apotheosis of the Pisani house, a sketch for the ceiling of the Villa Pisani at Stra in Veneto.

On the second floor, visitors can discover the works of the eighteenth in the reigns of Louis XV and Louis XVI, and the large paintings of the early nineteenth century. For the eighteenth century French strong point of the museum collections, there are paintings of Antoine Watteau, François Desportes, Carle Van Loo, Jean-Honoré Fragonard (two sketches, The Hunt and The Surprise, the paintings Cephalus and Procris, Jupiter, the guise of Diana, seduced Callisto, and Coresus Callirrhoe and another sketch, The Nymph lo and Jupiter), François Boucher, Jean-Francois de Troy, Noel Halle, Nicolas Lancret, Jean-Baptiste Pater, Jean-Baptiste Chardin with his masterful still lifes, Jean-Baptiste Greuze, Hubert Robert, François-André Vincent, Jacques-Louis David and Joseph-Marie Vien. Among sculptures are the famous bust of Voltaire by Jean-Antoine Houdon. The first half of the nineteenth century is represented with works of Ingres, Pierre-Narcisse Guérin, Camille Corot, Ary Scheffer, Eugène Devéria, Pierre Puvis de Chavannes and others.

Upstairs, a large room is dedicated to modern art of the twentieth century and contemporary art, and on the ground floor the Gumery room has large canvases from the late nineteenth century and sculptures. These include works by Pierre-Narcisse Guérin, Henri Gervex and other large academic pictures of the nineteenth century. From the second half of the century it presents works of Eugène Boudin, Johan Barthold Jongkind, Claude Monet, Alfred Sisley, Henri Lebasque and Albert Lebourg. From the twentieth century the museum includes Maurice Denis, Maxime Maufra, Louis Valtat and Angevin Alexis Mérodack-Jeaneau, as well as contemporary works of François Morellet, Jean-Pierre Pincemin and Daniel Tremblay.

=== The "History of Angers" tour ===
A gallery of archaeological artifacts and works of decorative art has been created from the collections of the former Museum of Antiquities, excavations at Angers and acquisitions. It shows the development of the city of Angers from its origins to contemporary urban development projects. The old and new archaeological discoveries reveal the first traces of the site in the Neolithic and the creation of the Gallo-Roman city named Juliomagus. Fragments of stone and wood evoke the sculptural decoration of churches and wooden-walled houses. The social, economic and cultural importance is illustrated by an iconography: portraits, city views and photographs.

== Exhibitions ==
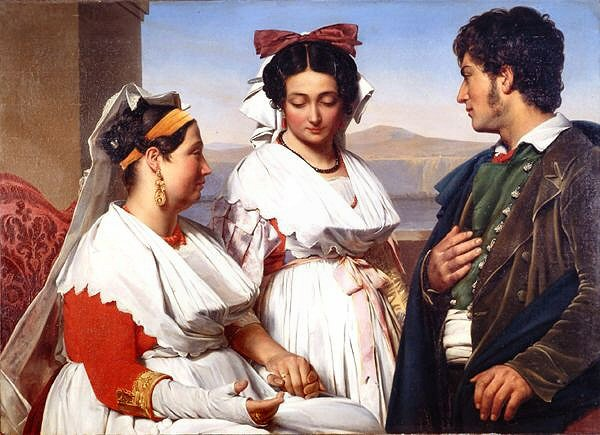
Demande de mariage by Guillaume Bodinier (1795–1872)

Two or three temporary exhibitions are presented annually at the museum in the temporary exhibition hall, such as works of Niki de Saint Phalle in 2004 or François Morellet in 2006. Some exhibitions are now held in permanent collections, such as the 2008 exhibition of Agnès Thurnauer.

=== Past exhibitions ===
- Morellet 1926–2006 etc. ... Recent Fantasies, June 25 to November 12, 2006
- Olivier Debré retrospective, May 25 to November 4, 2007
- Marie-Jo Lafontaine: Dreams are Free, December 15, 2007 to April 13, 2008
- Anthony Caro from May 24 to September 21, 2008
- Daniel Tremblay of 8 November 2008 to May 3, 2009
- Robert Malaval retrospective (1937–1980), June 13 to October 25, 2009
- Creating a Portrait: Rodin and His Models, December 4, 2009 to March 28, 2010
- Jean-Pierre Pincemin, May 8 to September 19, 2010
- Loriot & Melia Vu-not-seen, 30 October 2010 to April 3, 2011
