= Chambellay =

- Commune
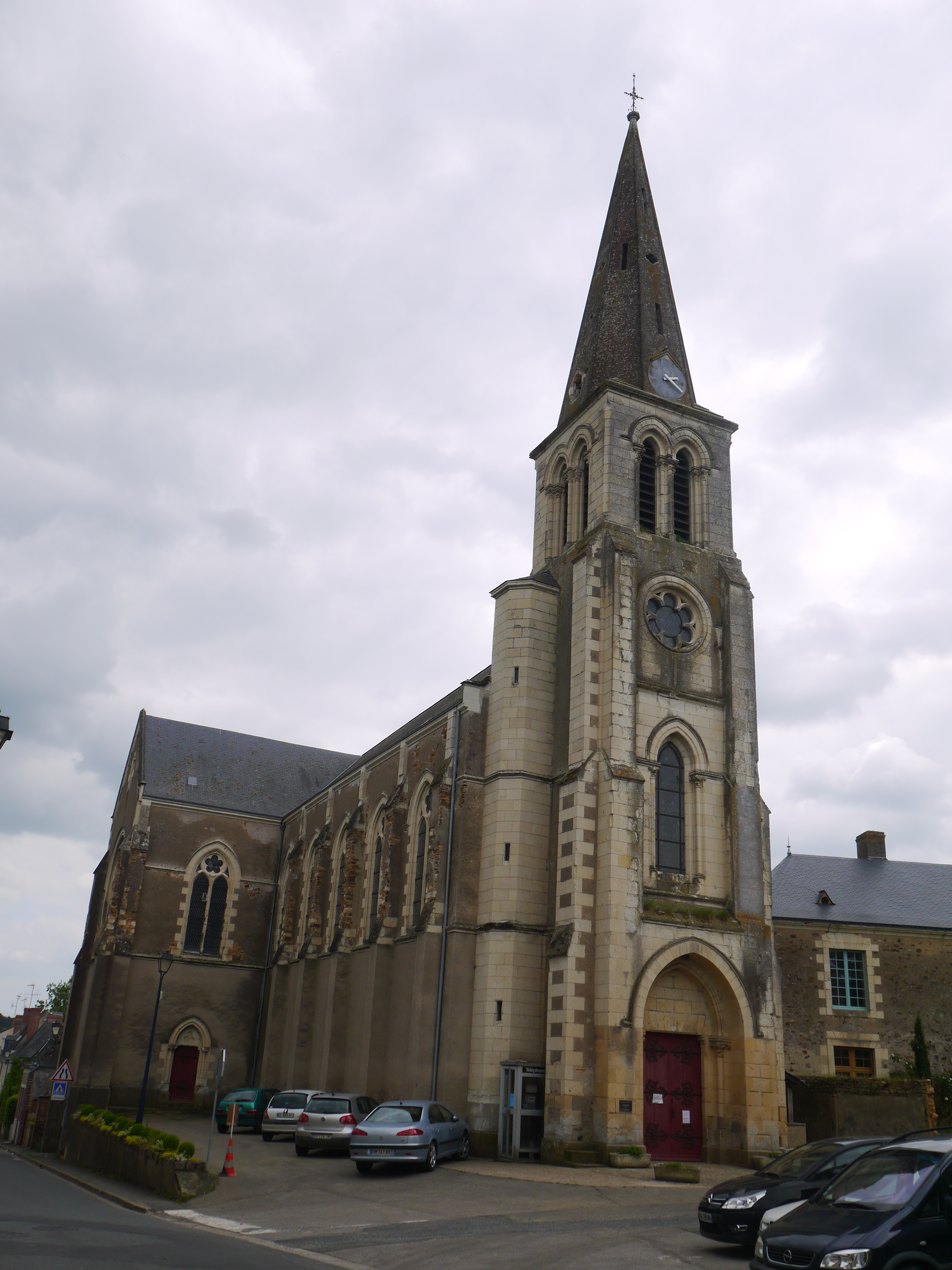
- The church in Chambellay

- Coat of arms
- Location of Chambellay
- Location within France Location within Pays de la Loire
- Coordinates: 47°41′28″N 0°40′56″W
- Country: France
- Region: Pays de la Loire
- Department: Maine-et-Loire
- Arrondissement: Segré
- Canton: Tiercé
- Intercommunality: Vallées du Haut-Anjou

Government
  - Mayor (2020–2026): Jean Pagis
- Area^{1}: 12.86 km^{2} (4.97 sq mi)
- Elevation: 75 m (246 ft)
- Highest elevation: 76 m (249 ft)
- Lowest elevation: 17 m (56 ft)
- Population (2023): 411
  - Density: 32.0/km^{2} (82.8/sq mi)
- Demonym(s): Cambolitain, Cambolitaine
- Time zone: UTC+01:00 (CET)
  - Summer (DST): UTC+02:00 (CEST)
- INSEE/Postal code: 49064 /49220
- ^{1} French Land Register data, which excludes lakes, ponds, glaciers > 1 km^{2} (0.386 sq mi or 247 acres) and river estuaries.

Chambellay (French pronunciation: [ʃɑ̃bɛlɛ]) is a commune in the Maine-et-Loire department in western France.

== See also ==
- Communes of the Maine-et-Loire department
