= Gnaeus Aufidius (tribune 170 BC) =

2nd-century BC Roman politician

Gnaeus Aufidius was a nobleman of ancient Rome, a member of the Aufidia gens, who lived in the 2nd century BC.

== Prosecution of Gallus ==
He was tribune of the plebs in 170 BC. During this time he accused the praetor Gaius Lucretius Gallus on account of his oppression of the people of the Chalcidean peninsula, and successfully pled his case such that Gallus was required to pay a fine.

== Enabling importation of African wildlife ==
The writer Pliny the Elder mentions a "Gnaeus Aufidius" who was a tribune of the plebs who was responsible for a Senatus consultum overturning the Roman law against importing African wildlife into Rome, allowing their use in the circus. However he does not mention when exactly this happened, so there has been some scholarly disagreement over whether this Aufidius was the one Pliny meant, or whether some other was intended. Many scholars, such as Gaetano De Sanctis, believed the tribune of 170 BC was indeed responsible for this. This seems to align with an anecdote described by Livy, in which 63 imported African animals (probably lions) featured in a spectacle in 169 BC.

Other scholars, such as Harris Rackham, thought the overturning of the law was done decades later, around 110 or 114 BC, by the praetor Gnaeus Aufidius, friend of Cicero, or possibly some otherwise unknown Aufidius who was tribune. The primary motivation for this claim is the belief that while there had been earlier spectacles featuring African animals starting around 250 BC, relations and trade with Africa in 170 BC were not frequent enough to warrant the existence of these laws at all (whereas it was quite well established by 110 BC), so it seems unlikely these laws would even have existed for Aufidius to overturn in 170 BC.

Still others, such as Giovanni Battista Pighi, believe the Senatus Consultum dates to 140 BC, which would seem to rule out both of these men as the same Gnaeus Aufidius.

Regardless of which specific Gnaeus Aufidius this was, historians have noted a possible profit motive in either Aufidius's actions here, as the Aufidia gens was known to have significant business interests in North Africa, primarily in grain, but perhaps also in the wild animal trade.

== Descendants ==
The equites Lucius Aufidius Panthera of the 2nd century AD is thought to be a descendant of this Gnaeus Aufidius, or a freedman of his family, owing to his very unusual cognomen, "Panthera", Latin for "panther".
