= Rogatio =

Ancient Roman legislative process

In the Roman republic, a rogatio (from Latin rogo, "ask, place a question before") is a proposed piece of legislation. All legislation during the republic was moved before an assembly of the people. The rogatio procedure underscores the fact that the Roman Senate could issue decrees, but was not a legislative body. Only the people, organised in an assembly, could pass legislation.

A magistrate with the jus contionandi could call a contio, an informal assembly of the people, before which he could announce new legislation. A bill's proposer was its lator; a supporter was an auctor. After a magistrate promulgated a bill, under the lex Caecilia Didia of 98 BC, a trinundium had to elapse. A trinundium meant three market days. Immediately before an assembly was called to vote on a bill, a special contio was called so that a debate on the proposal could be held. Once that debate was over, the contio immediately became the assembly that could vote on the matter.

With only a few exceptions, the main legislative assembly was the comitia tributa. Told to depart into your groups (Latin: descedite, Quirites), the contio organised into the appropriate legislative assembly. Then after an initial prayer, the presiding magistrate opened voting by asking the people velitis, iubeatis ... vos, Quirites, rogo ("Do you wish, do you command, ... I ask you, citizens"). Each tribe was then called by an order set by lot; the centuries voted according to a pre-determined order with the wealthier centuries voting first. The citizens in each tribe then voted either uti rogas ("as you ask") or antiquo ("I contradict"). When a majority was reached, voting ended and all tribes which had not yet voted were dismissed.

Plebeian tribunes and other magistrates, most especially the consuls, could veto proceedings but only before the taking of lots for the order in which the tribes were to vote. It was also not acceptable for bills to be vetoed by any magistrate without any discussion. Threats of veto against a bill or its general unpopularity among the people usually led to the bill's withdrawal. If a bill was passed (rogatio lata est), it became a law (lex) after the presiding magistrate made a formal announcement (renuntiatio) of the assembly's decision.

In the early Republic, the Senate had to approve the constitutionality of a law before it was enacted; after the passage of the lex Publilia Philonis in 339 BC, which required that at least one of the two censores be a plebeian, this approval (patrum auctoritas) was required before the bill was put to a vote in the assembly. With controversial measures, however, the Senate was sometimes bypassed. If a bill was proposed for the purpose of declaring war, it had to be brought before the comitia centuriata.

All copies of statutes, proposed laws, and other public documents were recorded in the aerarium under the stewardship of the urban quaestors.

== See also ==
- Rogatio Aufidia de ambitu

== Bibliography ==
- Cornell, Tim C (2022). "Roman political assemblies". In Arena, Valentina; Prag, Jonathan (eds.). Companion to the political culture of the Roman republic. Wiley Blackwell. pp. 220–35. ISBN 978-1-119-67365-1. LCCN 2021024437.
- de Libero, Loretana (2006). "rogatio". Brill's New Pauly. Brill. doi:10.1163/1574-9347_bnp_e1023880.
- Gruen, Erich (1995). The last generation of the Roman republic (Paperback ed.). Berkeley: University of California Press. ISBN 0-520-02238-6.
- Lintott, Andrew (1999). Constitution of the Roman republic. Oxford University Press. ISBN 978-0-19-926108-6. Reprinted 2009.
- Millar, Fergus (1998). The crowd in Rome in the late republic. Jerome Lectures. Ann Arbor: University of Michigan Press. ISBN 978-0-472-10892-3.
- Mouritsen, Henrik (2001). Plebs and politics in the late Roman republic. Cambridge University Press. doi:10.1017/cbo9780511482885. ISBN 978-0-521-79100-7.
- Mouritsen, Henrik (2017). Politics in the Roman republic. Cambridge: Cambridge University Press. ISBN 978-1-107-03188-3. OCLC 961266598.
- Mousourakis, George (2003). The historical and institutional context of Roman law. Ashgate. ISBN 978-0-7546-2108-9.
