= Alfidia =

Mother of the Roman empress, Livia

- Known for: mother of Empress Livia
- Spouse: Marcus Livius Drusus Claudianus
- Children: Livia Drusilla

Alfidia was the mother of Rome's first empress, Livia. She is mistakenly called Aufidia by Suetonius, and this was assumed to be her name for centuries, but inscriptions found show that her name was the rare nomen Alfidia.

== Biography ==
It was once thought that she was a daughter of Roman Magistrate Marcus Aufidius Lurco. In actuality, her name was Alfidia, a nomen which was quite rare.

She married the future praetor, Marcus Livius Drusus Claudianus. They had at least one child: a daughter Livia Drusilla (59 BC-29 AD). Her husband also adopted Marcus Livius Drusus Libo, who served as a Roman consul. Livia was to become the first Roman Empress and third wife of the first Roman Emperor Augustus. Alfidia would be the maternal grandmother to Roman emperor Tiberius Claudius Nero and Roman General Nero Claudius Drusus. The Roman emperors Caligula, Claudius and Nero were her direct descendants.

== Cultural depictions ==
Deborah Moore appears as Alfidia, the mother of a fictionalized Livia, in two 2007 episodes of the HBO/BBC series Rome. In A Necessary Fiction, she is present when a married Livia catches the eye of young Octavian, and both women are pleased when he insists that Livia divorce her current husband to marry him. Later, in De Patre Vostro, Alfidia lightly questions Octavian's sister Octavia's loyalty to her family at dinner, and is present when Octavian's mother Atia of the Julii has an altercation with daughter-in-law Livia.

== See also ==
- Aufidia gens

== Sources ==
- Suetonius, The Twelve Caesars, Tiberius and Caligula
