= Guillaume Bodinier =

French painter

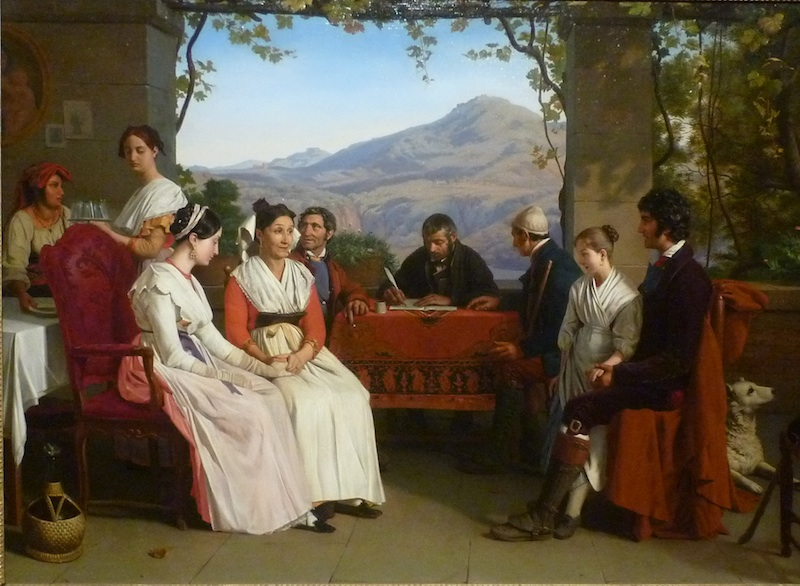
The Marriage Contract in Italy, 1831, Musée du Louvre

Guillaume Bodinier (Angers, 9 February 1795 – Angers, 25 August 1872), a French historical and portrait painter, was born in Angers. He studied in Rome under the direction of Pierre Guérin, and exhibited at the Salon from 1827 to 1857. After a long residence in Rome he returned to his native city, where he became director of the Museum, and died in 1872. His best work is the 'Angelus in Campagnano di Roma,' painted in 1836, and formerly in the collection of the Duke of Orléans.

== Gallery ==
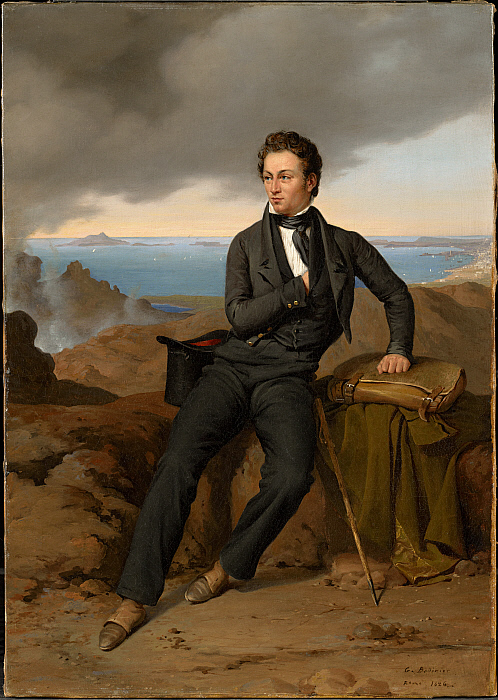
Théodore Jubin (1826), Oil on canvas, 20 3/8 x 14 7/16 in. (51.7 x 36.7 cm), Clark Art Institute
