= Gnaeus Aufidius (historian) =

2nd-century BC Roman politician

Gnaeus Aufidius Cn. f. (or "Gnaeus Aufidius, son of Gnaeus", see Roman filiation) was a politician, historian, and perhaps a jurist of the late 2nd and early 1st century BC.

He was quaestor in 119 BC, tribune of the plebs in 114 BC, praetor in 108 or 107 BC, and finally propraetor in Asia the following year, about one year before the birth of the writer Cicero, who, as a boy, was acquainted with Aufidius as an elderly blind scholar.

Cicero writes of him in a list of nine noteworthy blind men -- a list almost entirely copied by the 14th century poet Petrarch, but omitting Aufidius -- and celebrates him for the equanimity with which he bore blindness. It was said he missed seeing light more than the convenience of being able to see. We find from the theologian Jerome, that his patience was also recounted in the lost treatise de Consolatione.

While blind and advanced in age, he maintained a very active lifestyle. He spoke in the Roman Senate, and wrote a History of Greece which was, unusually for a historical work by a Roman writer, written in Greek. Cicero writes that he also gave advice to his friends (nec amicis deliberantibus deerat); and, on account of this expression, he has been ranked by some legal biographers among the Roman jurists.

In his old age, he adopted Cn. Aurelius Orestes, who consequently took the name Gnaeus Aufidius Orestes. This precedent has been quoted to show that the power of adopting does not legally depend on the power of begetting children.

Some scholars believe that this Gnaeus Aufidius is the tribune of the plebs who overturned the law banning importation of African wildlife into Rome, while others ascribe this to the Gnaeus Aufidius who was tribune in 170 BC.
