= Aufidia gens =

Ancient Roman family

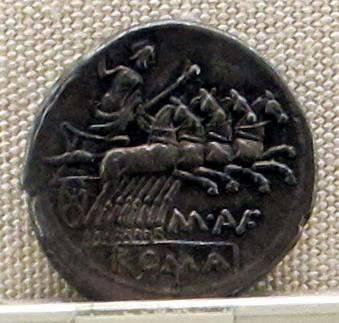
Ancient Roman coin in the National Roman Museum

The gens Aufidia was a plebeian family at ancient Rome, which occurs in history from the later part of the Republic to the third century AD. The first member to obtain the consulship was Gnaeus Aufidius Orestes, in 71 BC.

== Origins ==
Plutarch describes a Volscian leader by the name of Tullus Aufidius as part of the story of Gnaeus Marcius Coriolanus, early in the fifth century BC. In Livy, his name is given as Attius Tullius, and no other Aufidii are mentioned in history until the early second century BC.

== Praenomina ==
In Republican times, the Aufidii used the praenomina Gnaeus, Titus, Marcus, and Sextus. Lucius and Gaius are not found prior to the second century AD. The character Tullus Aufidius in Shakespeare's play Coriolanus predates the earliest historical mention of the gens by some three hundred years, and is identified as Attius Tullius in Livy; there is no other evidence that the praenomen Tullus was used by the Aufidii.

== Branches and cognomina ==
The cognomina of the Aufidii under the Republic are Lurco and Orestes. Gnaeus Aufidius Orestes was descended from the Aurelii Orestides, but was adopted by the historian Gnaeus Aufidius in his old age.

== Members ==
This list includes abbreviated praenomina. For an explanation of this practice, see filiation.

- Gnaeus Aufidius, tribune of the plebs in 170 BC.
- Gnaeus Aufidius Cn. f., praetor circa 107 BC and propraetor in Asia the following year. Cicero tells that he also wrote a History of Rome in Greek, despite being blind. At an advanced age, he adopted Gnaeus Aufidius Orestes, the consul of 71.
- Gnaeus Aufidius T. f., praetor in Sicily in the late second century BC.
- Titus Aufidius, a jurist, was quaestor in 84 BC, and afterwards praetor in Asia.
- Gnaeus Aufidius Cn. f. Cn. n. Orestes, consul in 71 BC.
- Marcus Aufidius Lurco, tribune of the plebs in 61 BC.
- Aufidius Namusa, a pupil of the jurist Servius Sulpicius Rufus, who compiled a work based on the books of Sulpicius' various students.
- Sextus Aufidius, warmly recommended by Cicero to Quintus Cornificius, proconsul of Africa in 43 BC.
- Titus Aufidius, a physician and native of Sicily, who probably lived during the first century BC.
- (Publius) Aufidius Bassus, an orator and historian, who lived during the reigns of Augustus and Tiberius.
- Publius Juventius Celsus Titus Aufidius Hoenius Severianus, or simply "Titus Aufidius", an influential jurist of the late first century and early second century, was consul suffectus in AD 115, and ordinarius in 129.
- Aufidius Chius, an eminent jurist known only from the Fragmenta Vaticana, is probably a misreading for some other jurist, perhaps "Aufidius Celsus", referring to Publius Juventius Celsus Titus Aufidius Hoenius Severianus.
- Lucius Aufidius Panthera, praefectus of the fleet at Britannia, in the early second century, known for an altar he dedicated to Neptune, at Lemanis, now in Kent.
- Lucius Aufidius Panthera Sassina, an officer in the Roman auxilium Ala Ulpium Contrariorum, stationed in Pannonia in AD 133.
- Gaius Aufidius Victorinus, consul suffectus in AD 155, was praefectus urbi circa 179 to 183, and consul ordinarius in 183.
- Marcus Aufidius C. f. Fronto, consul in AD 199.
- Marcus Aufidius M. f. C. n. Fronto, son of the consul of AD 199.
- Gaius Aufidius Victorinus, consul in AD 200.
- Gaius Aufidius Marcellus, consul for the second time in AD 226; the date of his first consulship is unknown.

== Aufidii in literature ==
- Tullus Aufidius, general of the Volscian army in The Tragedy of Coriolanus by William Shakespeare.
- Aufidius Victorinus, governor of Germania superior in Romanike (2006–2014) by Codex Regius.

== See also ==
- List of Roman gentes
- Alfidia, erroneously called Aufidia by Suetonius

== Bibliography ==
- Marcus Tullius Cicero, De Domo Sua, De Officiis, Epistulae ad Familiares, Pro Plancio, Tusculanae Disputationes.
- Titus Livius (Livy), History of Rome.
- Eutropius, Breviarium Historiae Romanae (Abridgement of the History of Rome).
- Digesta, or Pandectae (The Digest).
- Johann Caspar von Orelli, Inscriptionum Latinarum Selectarum Amplissima Collectio (An Extensive Collection of Select Latin Inscriptions), Orell Füssli, Zürich (1828).
- Dictionary of Greek and Roman Biography and Mythology, William Smith, ed., Little, Brown and Company, Boston (1849).
- Wilhelm Dittenberger, Sylloge Inscriptionum Graecarum (Collection of Greek Inscriptions, abbreviated SIG), Leipzig (1883).
- Adolf Kirchhoff, Ulrich von Wilamowitz-Moellendorff, et alii, Inscriptiones Graecae (Greek Inscriptions), Berlin-Brandenburgische Akademie der Wissenschaften (1878–present).
- Inscriptiones Graecae XII,5. Inscriptiones Cycladum (Greek Inscriptions, abbreviated IG), ed. Friedrich Hiller von Gaertringen. 2 vols. Berlin 1903–1909.
- T. Robert S. Broughton, The Magistrates of the Roman Republic, American Philological Association (1952–1986).
- Paul M. M. Leunissen, Konsuln und Konsulare in der Zeit von Commodus bis Severus Alexander (Consuls and Consulars from the Time of Commodus to Severus Alexander), Verlag Gieben, Amsterdam, (1989).
- The Roman Inscriptions of Britain (abbreviated RIB), Oxford, (1990–present).
- T. Corey Brennan, The Praetorship in the Roman Republic, 2 volumes, Oxford, 2000.
