= Livia =

Roman empress from 27 BC to AD 14

Livia Drusilla
- Julia Augusta
- Bust, Musée Saint-Raymond

Roman empress
- Tenure: 16 January 27 BC – 19 August AD 14
- Born: 30 January 59 BC; Rome, Italy, Roman Republic
- Died: AD 29 (aged 87); Rome, Italy, Roman Empire
- Burial: Mausoleum of Augustus
- Spouses: Tiberius Claudius Nero (43–39 BC); Augustus (38 BC – AD 14)
- Issue: 3, including: Tiberius; Nero Claudius Drusus
- Dynasty: Julio-Claudian
- Father: Marcus Livius Drusus Claudianus
- Mother: Alfidia

Livia Drusilla (30 January 59 BC – AD 29) was Roman empress from 27 BC to AD 14 as the wife of Augustus, the first Roman emperor. She was known as Julia Augusta after her formal adoption into the Julia gens in AD 14.

Livia was the daughter of senator Marcus Livius Drusus Claudianus and his wife Alfidia. She married Tiberius Claudius Nero around 43 BC, and they had two sons, Tiberius and Drusus. In 38 BC, she divorced Tiberius Claudius Nero and married the political leader Octavian. The Senate granted Octavian the title Augustus in 27 BC, effectively making him emperor. In her role as Roman empress, Livia served as an influential confidante to her husband and was rumoured to have been responsible for the deaths of several of his relatives, including his grandson Agrippa Postumus.

After Augustus died in AD 14, Tiberius was elevated, and Livia continued to exert political influence as the mother of the emperor until her death in AD 29. She was grandmother of the emperor Claudius, great-grandmother of the emperor Caligula, and great-great-grandmother of the emperor Nero. Livia was deified by Claudius in AD 42, bestowing her the title Diva Augusta.

== Birth and first marriage to Tiberius Claudius Nero ==
Livia Drusilla was born on 30 January 59 BC as the daughter of Marcus Livius Drusus Claudianus by his wife Alfidia. The diminutive Drusilla often found in her name suggests that she was not her father's first daughter. She may have had a brother named Gaius Livius Drusus who had two daughters named Livia Pulchra and Livilla. Her father also adopted Marcus Livius Drusus Libo.

She was married around 43 BC to Tiberius Claudius Nero, a man of patrician status who was fighting with her father on the side of Julius Caesar's assassins against Octavian. Her father committed suicide in the Battle of Philippi, along with Gaius Cassius Longinus and Marcus Junius Brutus, but her husband continued fighting against Octavian, now on behalf of Mark Antony and his brother Lucius Antonius. Her first child, the future emperor Tiberius, was born in 42 BC. In 40 BC, the family was forced to flee Italy in order to avoid the recriminations of Octavian in the aftermath of the siege of Perusia. They joined with Sextus Pompeius, a son of Pompey Magnus, who opposed the Second Triumvirate from his base in Sicily. Later, Livia, her husband Tiberius Nero and their two-year-old son, Tiberius, moved on to Greece.

== Wife to Augustus ==
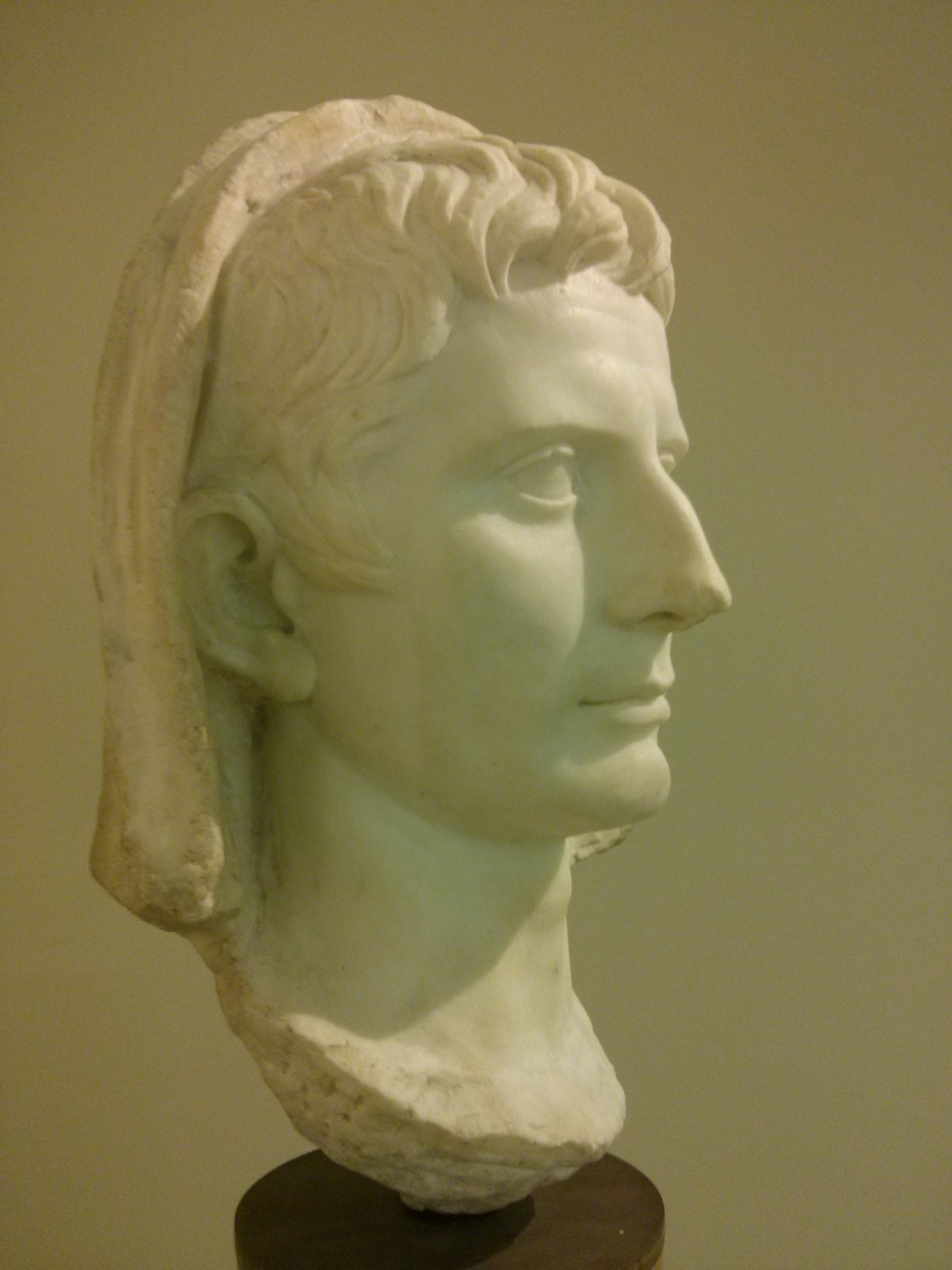
Bust of Augustus, National Archaeological Museum of the Marche Region

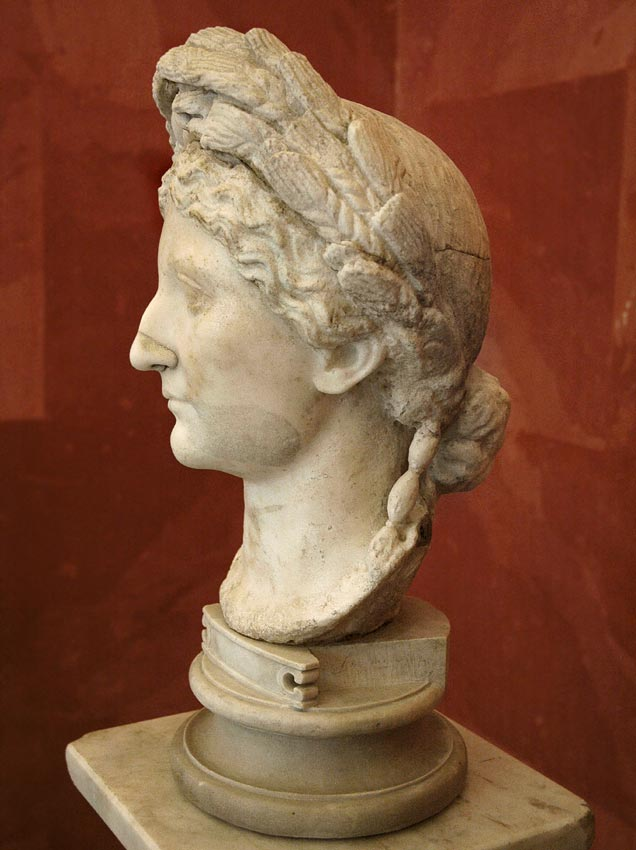
Bust of Livia, Hermitage Museum

After peace was established between the Triumvirate and the followers of Sextus Pompeius, a general amnesty was announced, and Livia returned to Rome, where she was personally introduced to Octavian in 39 BC. At this time, Livia already had one son, the future emperor Tiberius, and was pregnant with a second, Nero Claudius Drusus (also known as Drusus the Elder). Legend said that Octavian fell immediately in love with her, despite the fact that he was still married to Scribonia. Octavian divorced Scribonia on 30 October 39 BC, the very day Scribonia gave birth to his only surviving biological child, daughter Julia the Elder.

Seemingly around that time, when Livia was six months pregnant with her second child, Tiberius Claudius Nero was persuaded or forced by Octavian to divorce Livia. She gave birth on 14 January; three days later Octavian married Livia after waiving the traditional waiting period. On the day of his wedding to Livia, Octavian received a supposed omen of an eagle dropping a white hen with a laurel branch in its mouth into Livia's lap. This omen was interpreted as being an indication toward Livia's fertility, as she had given birth to two sons in her short four years of marriage to Nero. This was ironic because she was later unable to ever conceive again after her first pregnancy with Octavian ended in premature birth of a child who did not survive. Tiberius Claudius Nero was present at the wedding, giving her in marriage "just as a father would."

The importance of the patrician Claudii to Octavian's cause, and the political survival of the Claudii Nerones are probably more rational explanations for the tempestuous union. Nevertheless, Livia and Augustus remained married for the next 51 years, despite having only one child who died at or shortly after birth. She always enjoyed the status of privileged counselor to her husband, petitioning him on the behalf of others and influencing his policies, an unusual role for a Roman wife in a culture dominated by the pater familias.

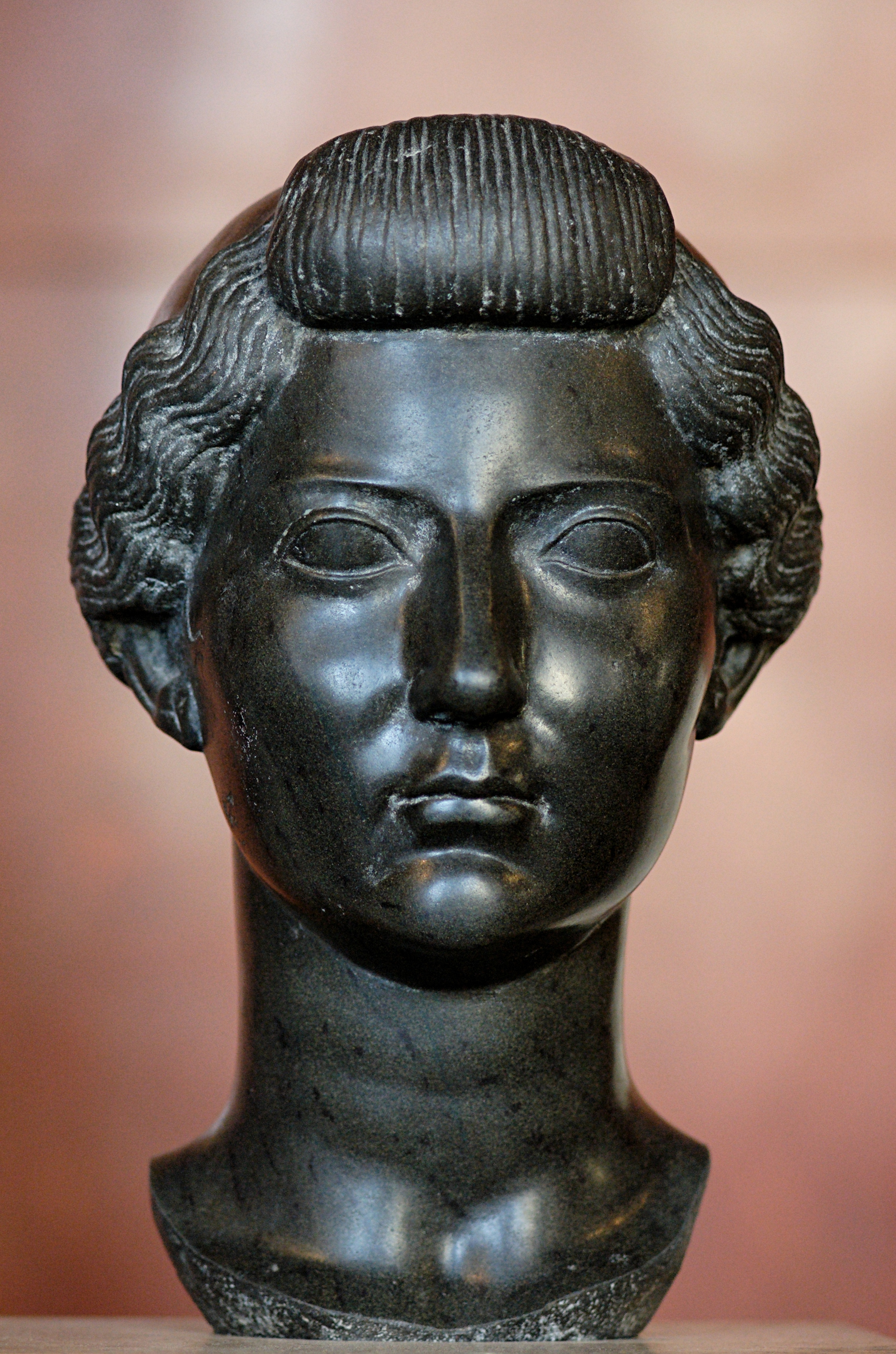
Sculpture of Livia in Egyptian basanite, c. 31 BC, Louvre, Paris

After Mark Antony's suicide following the Battle of Actium in 31 BC, Octavian returned to Rome triumphant; on 16 January 27 BC, the Senate bestowed upon him the honorary title of Augustus ("honorable" or "revered one"). Augustus rejected monarchical titles, instead choosing to refer to himself as Princeps Civitatis ("First Citizen of the State") or Princeps Senatus ("First among the Senate"). He and Livia formed the role model for Roman households. Despite their wealth and power, Augustus' family continued to live modestly in their house on the Palatine Hill. Livia would set the pattern for the noble Roman matrona. She wore neither excessive jewellery nor pretentious costumes; she took care of the household and her husband (often making his clothes herself), always faithful and dedicated. In 35 BC, Octavian gave Livia the unprecedented honour of ruling her own finances and dedicated a public statue to her. She owned and effectively administered copper mines in Gaul, estates of palm groves in Judea, and dozens of papyrus marshes in Egypt. She had her own circle of clients and pushed many protégés into political offices, including the grandfathers of the later emperors Galba and Otho.

With Augustus being the father of only one daughter (Julia by Scribonia), Livia revealed herself to be an ambitious mother and soon started to push her own sons, Tiberius and Drusus, into power. Drusus was a trusted general and married Augustus' favourite niece, Antonia Minor, having three children: the popular general Germanicus, Livilla, and the future emperor Claudius. Drusus was killed in a riding accident only a few years later, dying in 9 BC. This was also the same year in which Livia was honoured by the dedication of the Ara Pacis Augustae as a birthday present. Tiberius married Augustus' daughter Julia in 11 BC and was ultimately adopted as Augustus' heir in AD 4.

Rumor had it that Livia was behind the death of Augustus' nephew Marcellus in 23 BC. After Julia's two elder sons by Marcus Vipsanius Agrippa, whom Augustus had adopted as sons and successors, had died, the one remaining son, Agrippa Postumus, was adopted at the same time as Tiberius, but later Agrippa Postumus was sent into exile and finally killed. Tacitus charges that Livia was not altogether innocent of these deaths and Cassius Dio also mentions such rumours. There are also rumours mentioned by Tacitus and Cassius Dio that Livia brought about Augustus' death by poisoning fresh figs, although modern historians view this as unlikely. Augustus' granddaughter was Julia the Younger. Sometime between AD 1 and 14, her husband Lucius Aemilius Paullus was executed as a conspirator in a revolt. Modern historians theorise that Julia's exile was not actually for adultery but for involvement in Paullus' revolt. Tacitus alleged that Livia had plotted against her stepdaughter's family and ruined them. Julia died in AD 29 on the island to which she had been sent in exile twenty years earlier.

== Reign of Tiberius ==
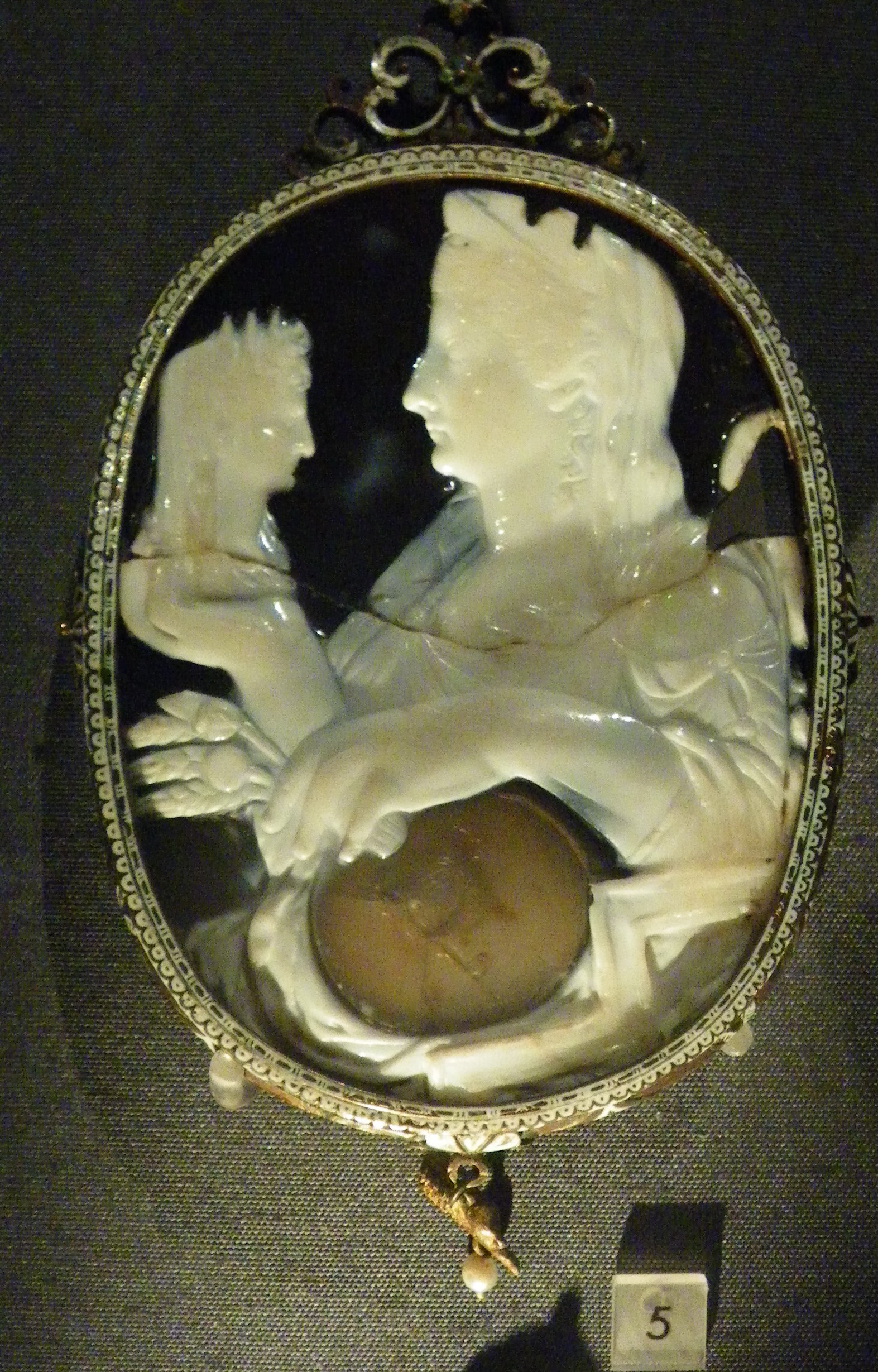
Sardonyx cameo of Livia with the bust of the Divus Augustus (Vienna)

Augustus died on 19 August AD 14, being deified by the Roman Senate shortly afterward. In his will, he left one third of his property to Livia, and the other two thirds to Tiberius. In the will, he also adopted her into the Julian family and granted her the honorific title of Augusta. These dispositions permitted Livia to maintain her status and power after her husband's death, under the new name of Julia Augusta. Tacitus and Cassius Dio wrote that rumours persisted that Augustus was poisoned by Livia, but these are mainly dismissed as malicious fabrications spread by political enemies of the dynasty. The most famous of these rumours was that Livia, unable to poison his food in the kitchens because Augustus insisted on only eating figs picked fresh from his garden, smeared each fruit with poison while still on the tree to preempt him. In Imperial times, a variety of fig cultivated in Roman gardens was called the Liviana, perhaps because of her reputed horticultural abilities, or as a tongue-in-cheek reference to this rumour.

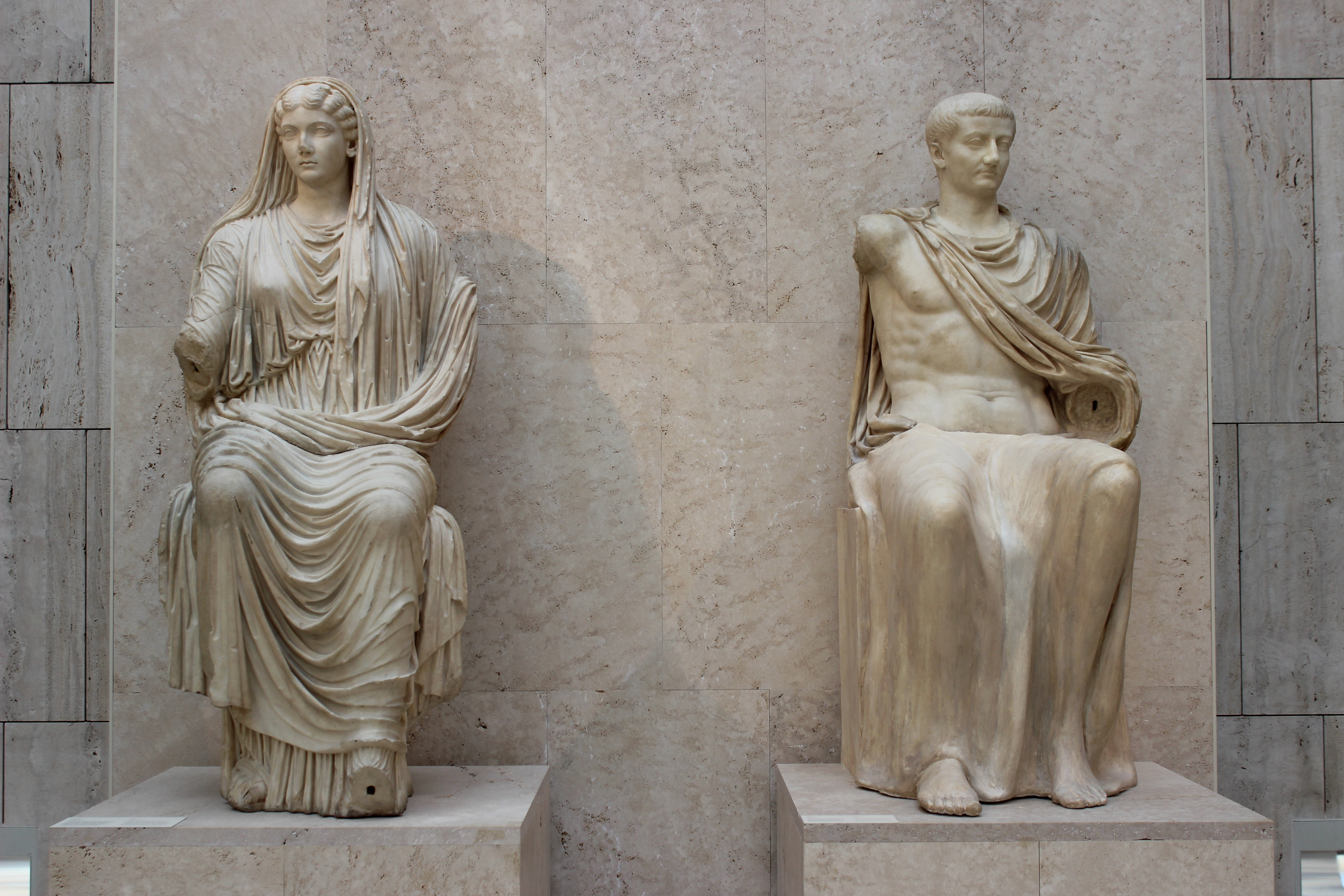
Livia and her son Tiberius, AD 14–19, from Paestum, National Archaeological Museum of Spain, Madrid

For some time, Livia and her son Tiberius, the new emperor, appeared to get along with each other. Speaking against her became treason in AD 20, and in AD 24 he granted his mother a theatre seat among the Vestal Virgins. Livia exercised unofficial but very real power in Rome. Eventually, Tiberius became resentful of his mother's political status, particularly against the idea that it was she who had given him the throne. At the beginning of his reign Tiberius vetoed the unprecedented title Mater Patriae ("Mother of the Fatherland") that the Senate wished to bestow upon her, in the same manner in which Augustus had been named Pater Patriae ("Father of the Fatherland") (Tiberius also consistently refused the title of Pater Patriae for himself).

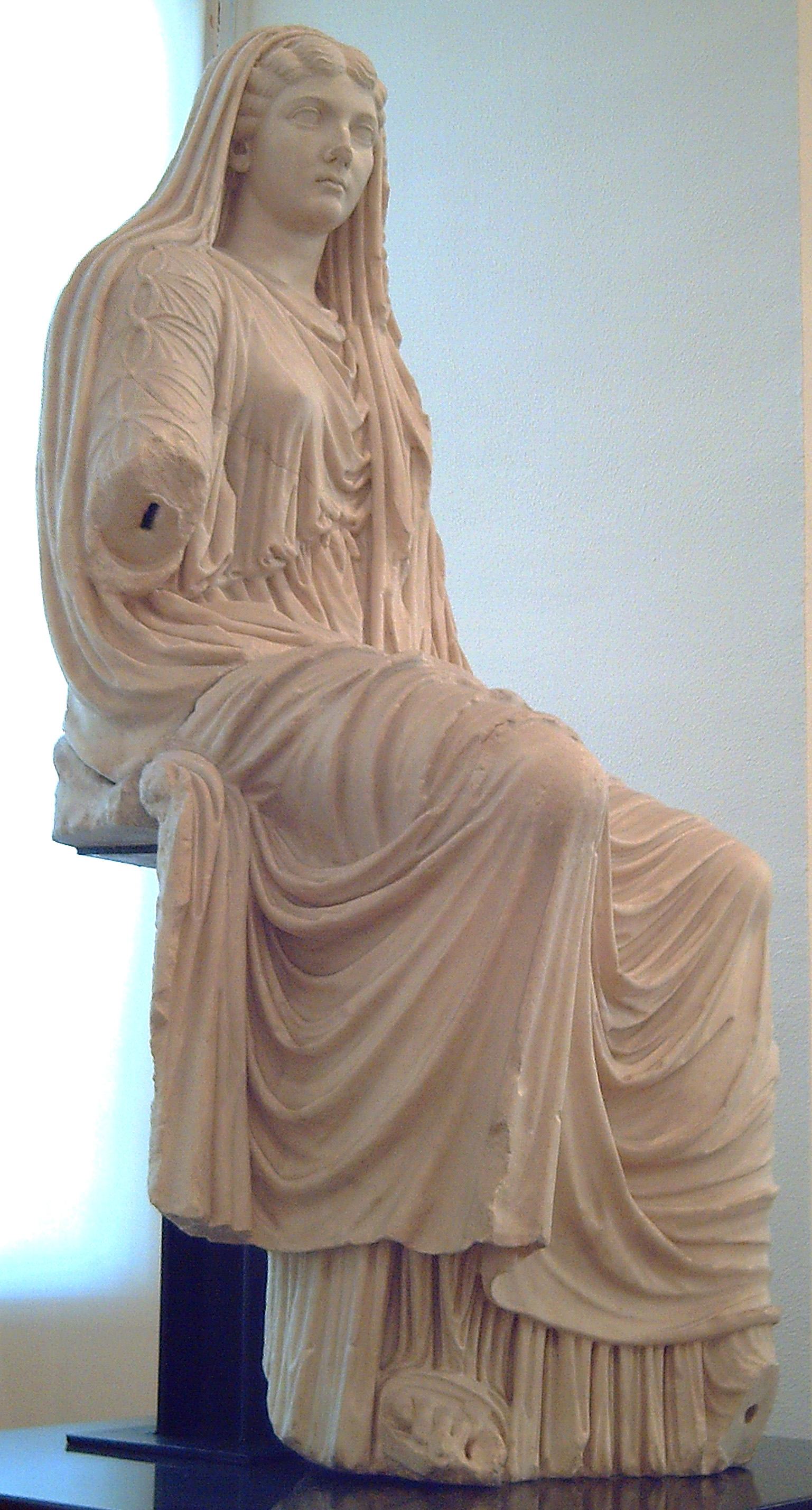
Livia Drusilla statue, from Paestum

The historians Tacitus and Cassius Dio depict an overweening, even domineering dowager, ready to interfere in Tiberius’ decisions. The most notable instances were the cases of Urgulania, grandmother of Claudius's first wife Plautia Urgulanilla, who correctly assumed that her friendship with the empress placed her above the law; and Munatia Plancina, suspected of murdering Germanicus and saved at Livia's entreaty. (Plancina committed suicide in AD 33 after being accused again of murder after Livia's death.) A notice from AD 22 records that Julia Augusta (Livia) dedicated a statue to Augustus in the center of Rome, placing her own name even before that of Tiberius.

Ancient historians give as a reason for Tiberius' retirement to Capri his inability to endure his mother any longer. Until AD 22 there had, according to Tacitus, been "a genuine harmony between mother and son, or a hatred well concealed;" Dio tells us that at the time of his accession already Tiberius heartily loathed her.

== Death and aftermath ==
In AD 22 she had fallen ill, and Tiberius hastened back to Rome in order to be with her. However, in AD 29 when she finally fell ill and died, he remained on Capri, pleading pressure of work and sending Caligula to deliver the funeral oration. Suetonius adds the macabre detail that "when she died... after a delay of several days, during which he held out hope of his coming, [she was at last] buried because the condition of the corpse made it necessary...". He also vetoed divine honours, stating that this was in accord with her own instructions. Later he vetoed all the honours the Senate had granted her after her death and cancelled the fulfilment of her will.

It was not until 13 years later, in AD 42 during the reign of her grandson Claudius, that all her honours were restored and her deification finally completed. She was named Diva Augusta (The Divine Augusta), and an elephant-drawn chariot conveyed her image to all public games. A statue of her was set up in the Temple of Augustus along with her husband's, races were held in her honour, and women were to invoke her name in their sacred oaths. Her and Augustus' tomb was later sacked at an unknown date.

Her Villa ad Gallinas Albas north of Rome is currently being excavated; its famous frescoes of imaginary garden views may be seen at the National Roman Museum. One of the most famous statues of Augustus (the Augustus of Prima Porta) came from the grounds of the villa.

== Personality ==
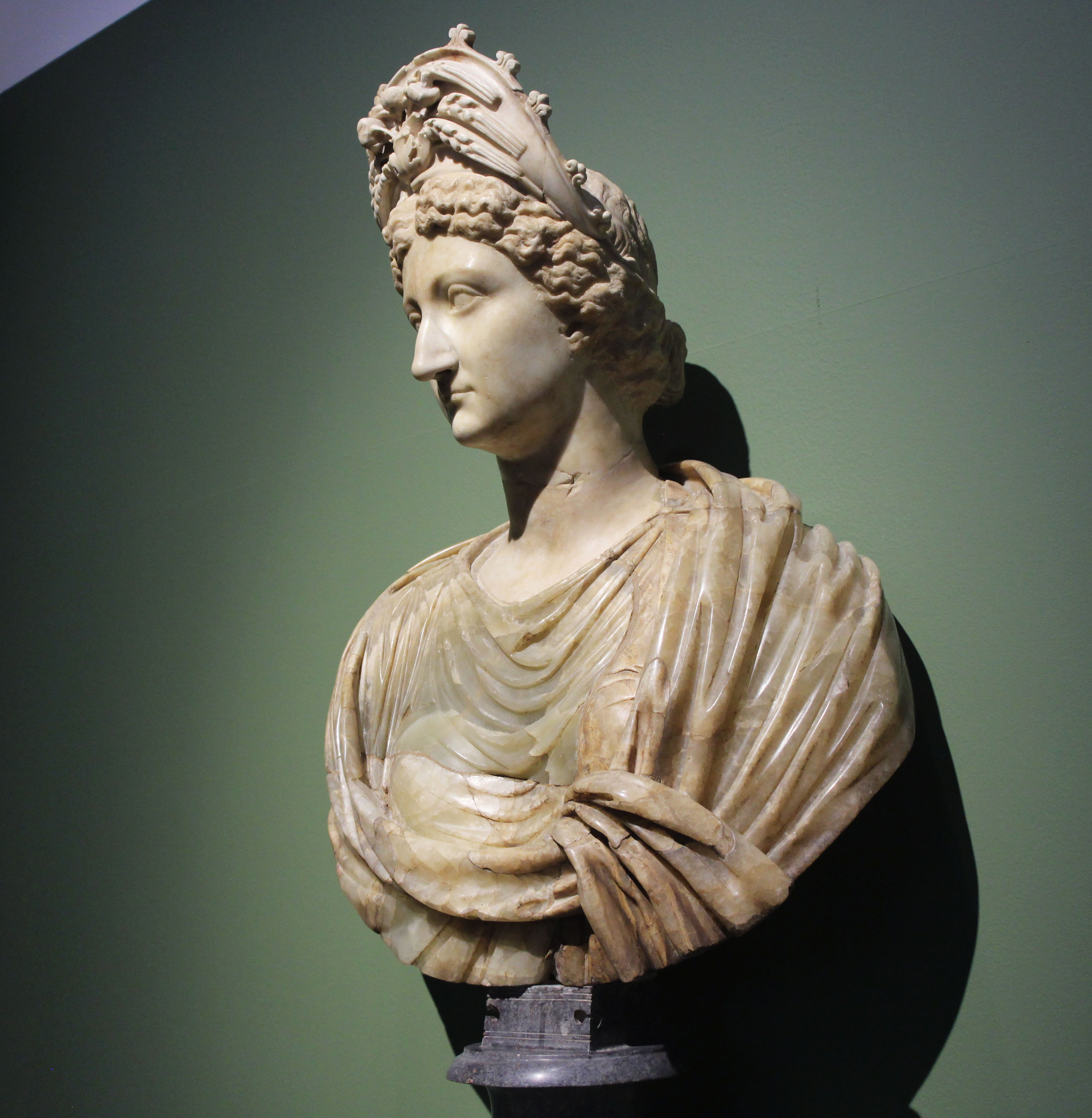
Livia as the Goddess Ceres, Capitoline Museums

While reporting various unsavory hearsay, the ancient sources generally portray Livia as a woman of proud and queenly attributes, faithful to her imperial husband. Dio records two of her utterances: "Once, when some naked men met her and were to be put to death in consequence, she saved their lives by saying that to a chaste woman such men are in no way different from statues. When someone asked her how she had gained respect from Augustus, she answered that it was by being scrupulously chaste herself, doing gladly whatever pleased him, not meddling with any of his affairs, and, in particular, by pretending neither to hear nor to notice the favourites of his passion."

With the passage of time, however, some thought that with widowhood a haughtiness and an overt craving for power and the outward trappings of status came increasingly to the fore. Livia had always been a principal beneficiary of the climate of adulation that Augustus had done so much to create, and which Tiberius despised ("a strong contempt for honours", Tacitus, Annals 4.37). In AD 24, whenever she attended the theatre, a seat among the Vestals was typically reserved for her (Annals 4.16), but this may have been intended more as an honour for the Vestals than for her (cf. Ovid, Tristia, 4.2.13f, Epist. ex Ponto 4.13.29f).

Livia played a vital role in the formation of her children Tiberius and Drusus. Attention focuses on her part in the divorce of her first husband, father of Tiberius, in 39/38 BC. Her role in this is unknown, as well as in Tiberius's divorce of Vipsania Agrippina in 12 BC at Augustus's insistence: whether it was merely neutral or passive, or whether she actively colluded in Caesar's wishes.

== Legacy ==
The Roman tribe Livia was named in her honour.

== In literature and popular culture ==
=== In ancient literature ===
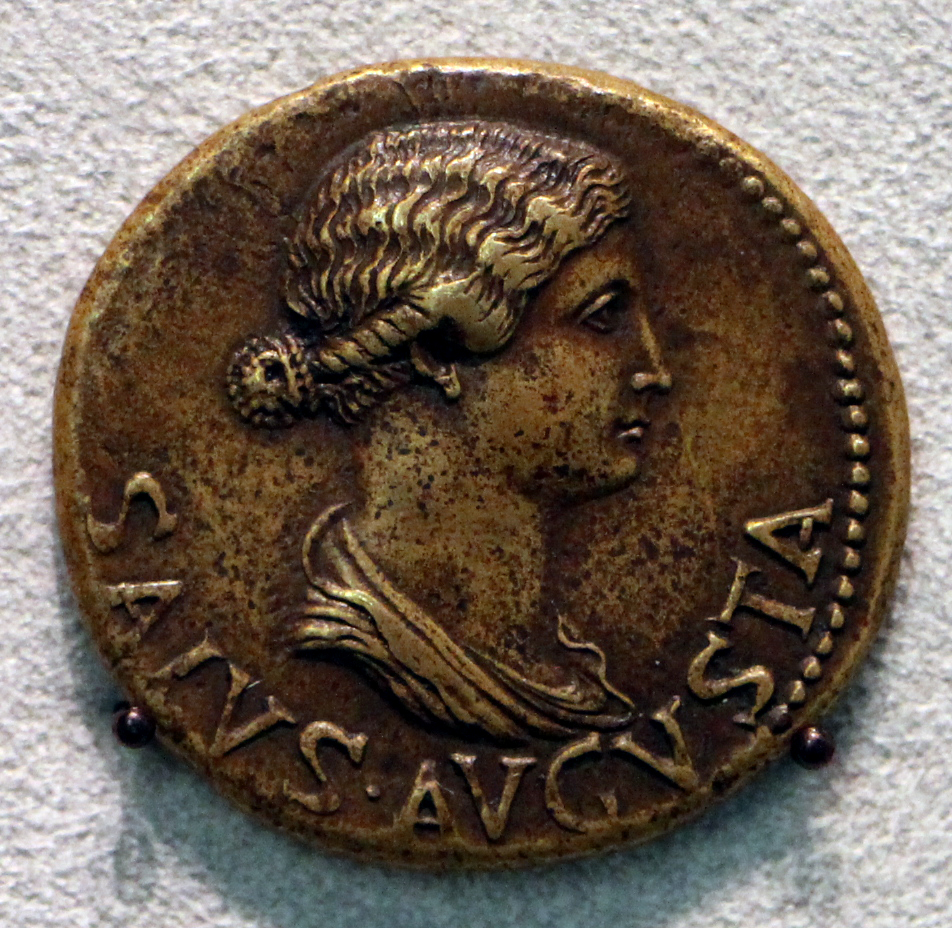
Dupondius probably depicting Livia as Salus Augusta.

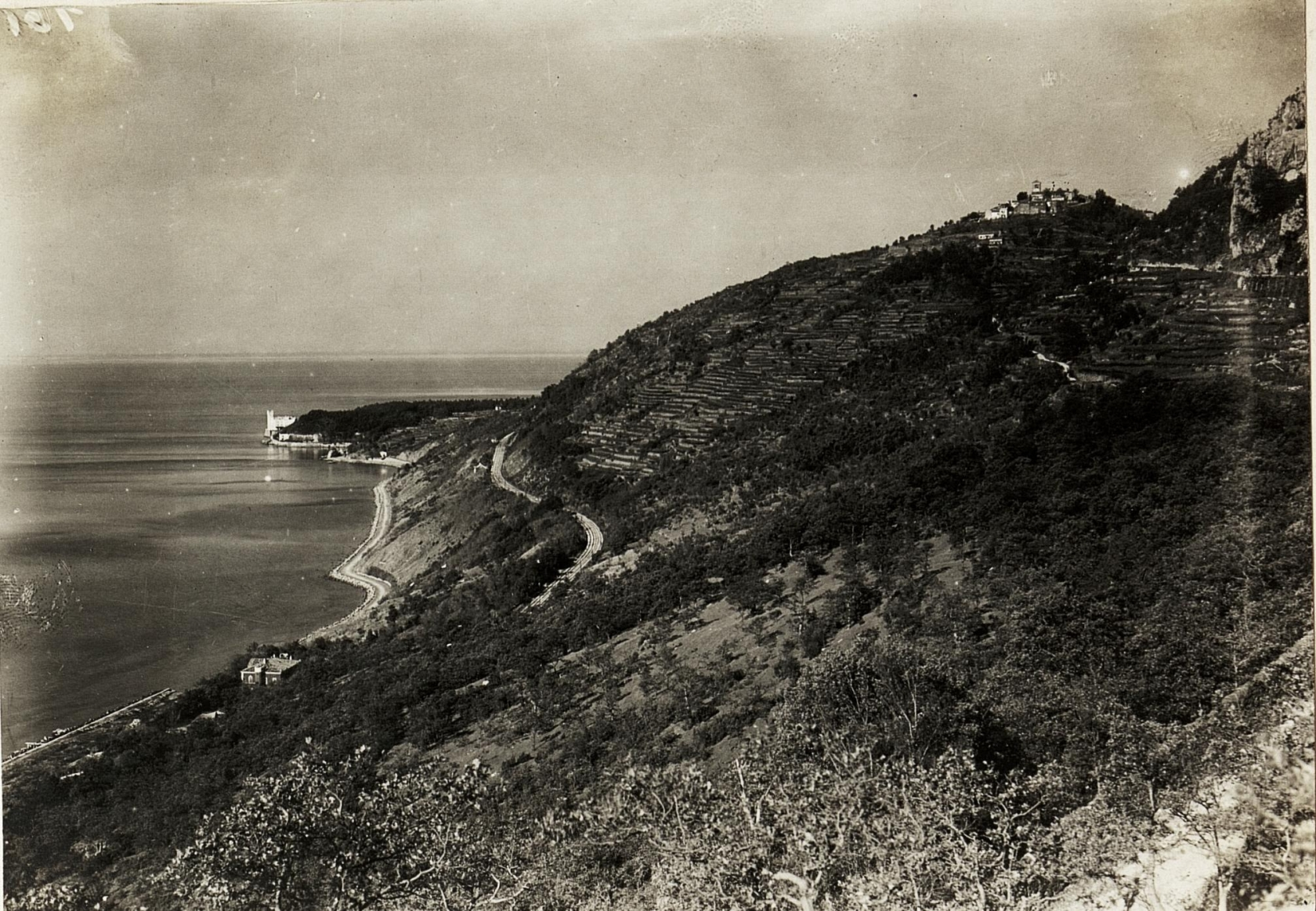
Historical picture in the direction of the vineyards by the sea between Prosecco and Barcola where the Empress' favourite wine was grown

The ancient sources all agree that Livia was Augustus' best confidant and counselor, but the extent of her influence remained disputed due to the numerous attempts by her political enemies to defame her dynasty. According to Suetonius, who had access to imperial records, Augustus would write down lists of items to be discussed with Livia, and then take careful notes of her replies to be consulted again later.

In Tacitus' Annals, meanwhile, Livia is famously depicted as having great influence, to the extent where she "had the aged Augustus firmly under control—so much so that he exiled his only surviving grandson to the island of Planasia"; Tacitus goes on to call her "a real catastrophe to the nation as a mother, and to the house of the Caesars as a stepmother" and "a compliant wife, but an overbearing mother".

Livia's image appears in ancient visual media such as coins and portraits. Following Octavia the Younger, Cleopatra and possibly Fulvia, she was the third (or fourth) woman to appear on provincial coins in 16 BC. On official Roman coinage, she was probably portrayed as Salus Augusta on the dupondius of Tiberius. Her portrait images can be chronologically identified partially from the progression of her hair designs, which represented more than keeping up with the fashions of the time as her depiction with such contemporary details translated into a political statement of representing the ideal Roman woman. Livia's image evolves with different styles of portraiture that trace her effect on imperial propaganda that helped bridge the gap between her role as wife to the emperor Augustus, to mother of the emperor Tiberius. Becoming more than the "beautiful woman" she is described as in ancient texts, Livia serves as a public image for the idealisation of Roman feminine qualities, a motherly figure, and eventually a goddesslike representation that alludes to her virtue. Livia's power in symbolising the renewal of the Republic with the female virtues Pietas and Concordia in public displays had a dramatic effect on the visual representation of future imperial women as ideal, honourable mothers and wives of Rome. Livia also restored the temple of the Bona Dea.

Livia is mentioned by Pliny the Elder, who describes the vines of the Pulcino wine ("Vinum Pucinum" - today at best "Prosecco"). This then special and rare wine from the sunny slopes northeast of Barcola in the direction of the place Prosecco or Duino (near the historic place Castellum Pucinum) was according to Pliny the favourite wine of the Empress Livia. She is said to have loved this Vinum Pucinum for its medicinal properties and at the end of her long life (she was 87) she attributed her old age to its consumption and commended it to everyone as an "elixir for a long life".

=== In modern literature ===
In the popular fictional work I, Claudius by Robert Graves—based on Tacitus' innuendo—Livia is portrayed as a thoroughly Machiavellian, scheming political mastermind. Determined never to allow republican governance to flower again, as she felt they led to corruption and civil war, and devoted to bringing Tiberius to power and then maintaining him there, she is involved in nearly every death or disgrace in the Julio-Claudian family up to the time of her death. On her deathbed she only fears divine punishment for all she had done, and secures the promise of future deification by her grandson Claudius, an act which, she believes, will guarantee her a blissful afterlife. However, this portrait of her is balanced by her intense devotion to the well-being of the Empire as a whole, and her machinations are justified as a necessarily cruel means to what she firmly considers a noble aspiration: the common good of the Romans, achievable only under strict imperial rule.

In John Maddox Roberts's short story "The King of Sacrifices," set in his SPQR series, Livia hires Decius Metellus to investigate the murder of one of Julia the Elder's lovers. In Antony and Cleopatra by Colleen McCullough, Livia is portrayed as a cunning and effective advisor to her husband, whom she loves passionately. Luke Devenish's "Empress of Rome" novels, Den of Wolves (2008) and Nest of Vipers (2010), have Livia as a central character in a fictionalised account of her life and times.

Livia plays an important role in two Marcus Corvinus mysteries by David Wishart, Ovid (1995) and Germanicus (1997). She is mentioned posthumously in Sejanus (1998).

=== On television and film ===
- In the 1968 ITV television series The Caesars, Livia was played by Sonia Dresdel.
- In the 1976 BBC television series I, Claudius based on the book, Livia was played by Siân Phillips. Phillips won a BAFTA for her portrayal of the role.
- In the 2003 television film Imperium: Augustus, (one of a series), Livia was portrayed by Charlotte Rampling.
- In the 2007 HBO/BBC television series Rome, Livia was dramatised by Alice Henley.
- Livia Drusilla is the series-protagonist of Sky Atlantic’s episodic period drama Domina (2021-2023), relating the rise of the Roman Principate with a focus on Livia's role and relationships. She is portrayed as having sworn a sacred oath to her father's shade to restore the Republic and to be playing a long con to that effect in concert with Gn. Calpurnius Piso. The child Livia is played by Meadow Nobrega, the adolescent and young adult Livia by Nadia Parkes, and the adult Livia by Kasia Smutniak.

== Descendants ==
Livia's marriage with Octavian produced one child, who died as result of premature birth. However, through her sons by her first husband, Tiberius and Drusus, she was a direct ancestor of all of the Julio-Claudian emperors as well as most of the extended Julio-Claudian imperial family.

1. Tiberius Claudius Nero (Tiberius Julius Caesar Augustus), 42 BC – AD 37, had two children

A. Drusus Julius Caesar, 14 BC – AD 23, had three children

I. Julia Livia, before AD 14– AD 43, had four children

a. Gaius Rubellius Plautus, 33–62, had several children
b. Gaius Rubellius Blandus
c. Rubellius Drusus

II. Tiberius Julius Caesar Nero (Tiberius Gemellus), 19 – 37 or 38, died without issue
III. Germanicus Gemellus, 19–23, died young

B. Tiberillus, died young

2. Nero Claudius Drusus 38–9 BC, had three children

A. Germanicus Julius Caesar, 15 BC – AD 19, had six children

I. Nero Julius Caesar Germanicus, 6–30/31, died without issue
II. Drusus Julius Caesar Germanicus, 8–33, died without issue
III. Gaius Julius Caesar Augustus Germanicus (Caligula), 12–41, had one child

a. Julia Drusilla, 39–41, died young

IV. Julia Agrippina (Agrippina the Younger), 15–59, had one child

a. Lucius Domitius Ahenobarbus (Nero Claudius Caesar Augustus Germanicus), 37–68, had one child

i. Claudia Augusta, January–April 63, died young

V. Julia Drusilla, 16–38, died without issue
VI. Julia Livilla, 18–42, died without issue

B. Claudia Livia (Livilla), 13 BC – AD 31, had three children

I. see children of Drusus Julius Caesar listed above

C. Tiberius Claudius Caesar Augustus Germanicus, 10 BC – AD 54, had four children

I. Tiberius Claudius Drusus, died young
II. Claudia Antonia, c. 30–66, had one child

a. a son, died young

III. Claudia Octavia, 39 or 40 – 62, died without issue
IV. Tiberius Claudius Caesar Britannicus, 41–55, died without issue

== See also ==
- Julio-Claudian family tree
- List of Roman and Byzantine empresses
