= Adèle de Bellegarde =

French hostess and socialite (1772–1830)

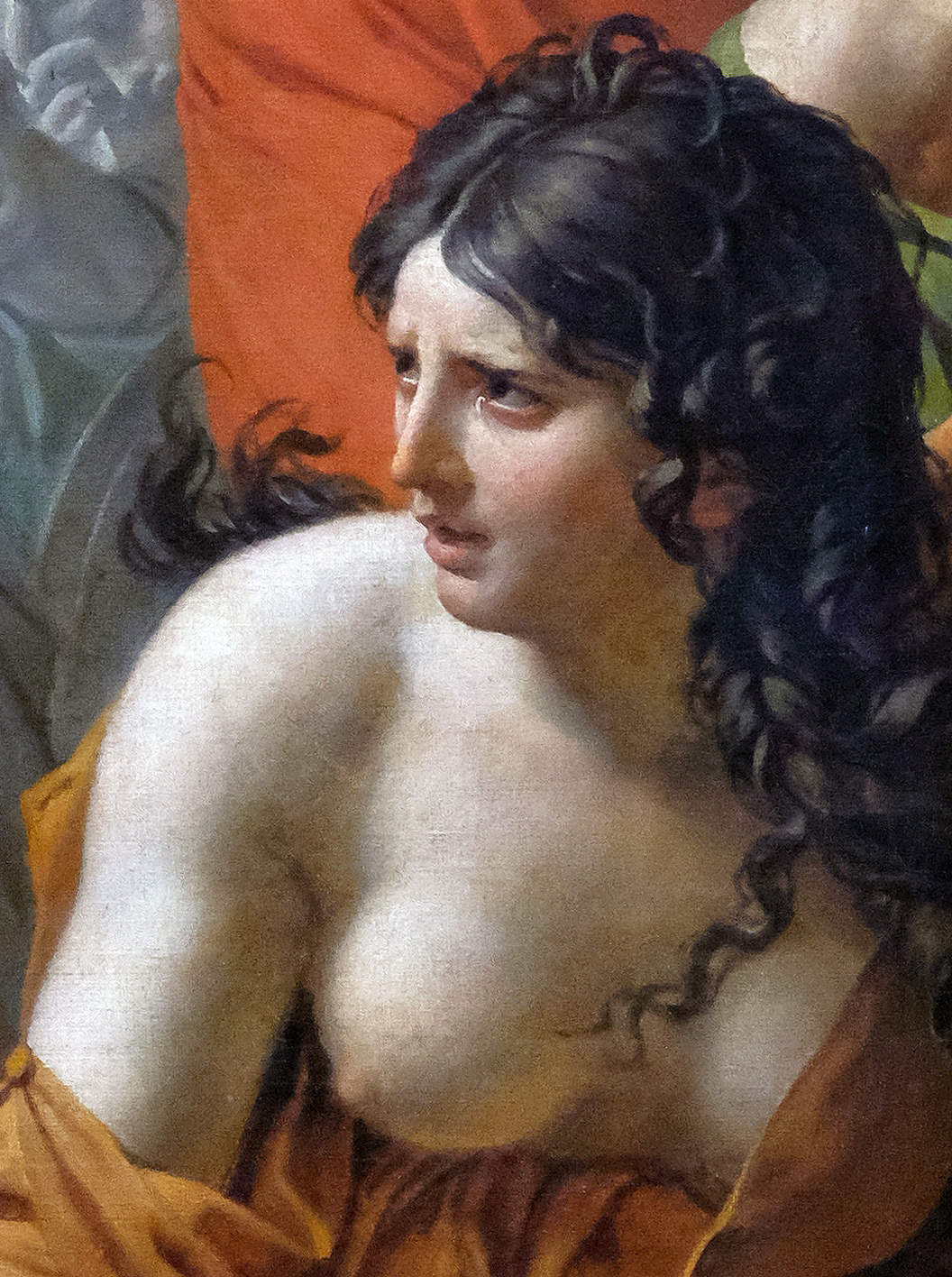
- Detail from David's painting The Intervention of the Sabine Women, showing de Bellegarde c. 1799.
- Born: Adélaïde Victoire Noyel de Bellegarde; 24 June 1772; Chambéry, Savoy, Kingdom of Sardinia
- Died: 7 January 1830 (aged 57); Paris
- Citizenship: Savoyard (1772 – November 1792), French (from November 1792)
- Known for: Model for Jacques-Louis David
- Spouse: Friedrich de Bellegarde (m. 1787; div. 1794)
- Partner(s): Hérault de Séchelles (from 1792; died 1794), Pierre-Jean Garat (c. 1800–c. 1802)
- Children: 4: 2 by her marriage, 2 with Garat, including Louis de Chenoise
- Parents: Robert-Eugène-François Noyel de Bellegarde (father); Marie Charlotte Adélaïde Le Cat d'Hervilly (mother)
- Relatives: Césarine Lucie Noyel de Bellegarde (sister), Françoise Aurore Eléonore Noyel de Bellegarde (sister)

Adélaïde Victoire Noyel, Comtesse de Bellegarde, known as Adèle de Bellegarde (24 June 1772 – 7 January 1830), was a Savoyard aristocrat. During the French Revolution, she became a popular salon hostess in Paris, and modelled for Jacques-Louis David's 1799 painting The Intervention of the Sabine Women.

Married to an officer in the Sardinian army, de Bellegarde fled Savoy at the outbreak of the French Revolutionary Wars in 1792, but returned at the end of the year to protect her family property from confiscation. She became the lover of Marie-Jean Hérault de Séchelles, and accompanied him to Paris in 1793. After de Séchelles' arrest and execution, she was in turn arrested and imprisoned in the Saint-Lazare prison, where she met Aimée de Coigny, a prominent salonnière. Released after the fall of Maximilien Robespierre in July 1793, de Bellegarde became a fixture of salon culture and established relationships with many leading figures of the period, including Talleyrand, Thérésa Tallien and Rouget de Lisle.

De Bellegarde's role in the creation of The Intervention of the Sabine Women has been described as part of the painting's "legend". It provoked numerous, often contradictory, Parisian stories and rumours, which often revolved around de Bellegarde's status as a sex symbol. Her involvement, along with that of her sister Aurore, was considered a significant influence on Parisian cultural tastes, and has been discussed at length in later scholarship on the painting.

She maintained her salon during the French Empire, where she became known as a royalist and an opponent of Napoleon, and during the Bourbon Restoration. In later life, she became known for her religious and charitable activity in the town of Chenoise, where she owned a château. She died in Paris on 7 January 1830.

De Bellegarde and her sister Aurore were known as Les Dames de Bellegarde. The art historian Ewa Lajer-Burcharth has written that the sisters were "known to epitomise the whole world of fashionable femininity under the Directoire."

== Early life and family ==
Adélaïde Victoire Noyel de Bellegarde was born on 24 June 1772 in Chambéry, the former capital of the Duchy of Savoy and its largest city on the French side of the Alps.

Adèle was the elder daughter of Robert-Eugène-François Noyel de Bellegarde, Marquis des Marches and a general in the army of the Dutch Estates. Her mother, Marie Charlotte Adélaïde Le Cat d'Hervilly, was a Picard noblewoman and sister of the French general Louis Charles d'Hervilly. The Noyel de Bellegarde family were one of the oldest in Savoy: since 1530, they had owned the Château des Marches, a castle constructed in 1342 on the border between Savoy and Dauphiné. The family divided their time between the castle and an hôtel particulier at 1 Rue Croix-d'Or in Chambéry. Her sister Césarine Lucie was born on 30 September 1774, while her mother died giving birth to her youngest sister, Françoise Eléonore Aurore (known as Aurore), on 3 July 1776.

On 5 November 1787, de Bellegarde was married to Friedrich de Bellegarde, the son of her father's brother Jean-François de Bellegarde and a frequent visitor to the family home. Friedrich, a freemason, a native of Saxony and a captain in the Sardinian army, (Note: Merlin states that he was in Prussian service. Most sources agree with Daudet and Vermale that he began in Saxon service, but transferred to that of Sardinia in 1774, when he was promoted to captain.) was thirty-five; she was fifteen. The couple had two children — a daughter and a son — between 1787 and 1791. Her father died early in 1790, leaving Adèle the title of Comtesse de Bellegarde, while Césarine Lucie died in May 1792 at the age of eighteen.

== French invasion of Savoy (1792) ==
After the beginning of the French Revolution in 1789, tensions grew between France and its monarchical neighbours, including the Kingdom of Sardinia, of which Savoy was a part, largely over the mutual hostility between revolutionary and monarchical ideals, the perceived threat to the revolutionary state from émigré aristocrats, and European monarchs' concern for the safety and rule of Louis XVI. Riots broke out across Savoy, including in Chambéry, prompted by unrest at the French abolition of seigneurial dues (which prompted calls among the rural population for the same) and at rising prices, partly caused by the immigration of wealthy French aristocrats. Little is known of de Bellegarde during this period: Vermale suggests that she and her husband may have sheltered some of the numerous French émigrés who fled across the border to Savoy.

On 20 April 1792, the French National Assembly voted for war with Austria and France invaded the Austrian Netherlands, beginning the War of the First Coalition. In August, news reached Savoy that the French armies were preparing an invasion. Friedrich de Bellegarde, now a lieutenant-colonel in Sardinian service, was given command of the area around Chambéry, while the Château des Marches was fortified, garrisoned and equipped with cannon. The château was made the headquarters of the Sardinian forces, commanded by General de Lazary.

In early September, Friedrich ordered Adèle and Aurore to leave for Piedmont, to which most of the Savoyard nobility not involved in the military preparation were already in the process of evacuating. According to the de Bellegardes' biographer Ernest Daudet, the sisters were reluctant to leave, as they had been hopefully expecting a French victory. Their friend Aimée de Coigny later wrote that they had been "contentes de devenir Françaises" ("happy to become Frenchwomen").

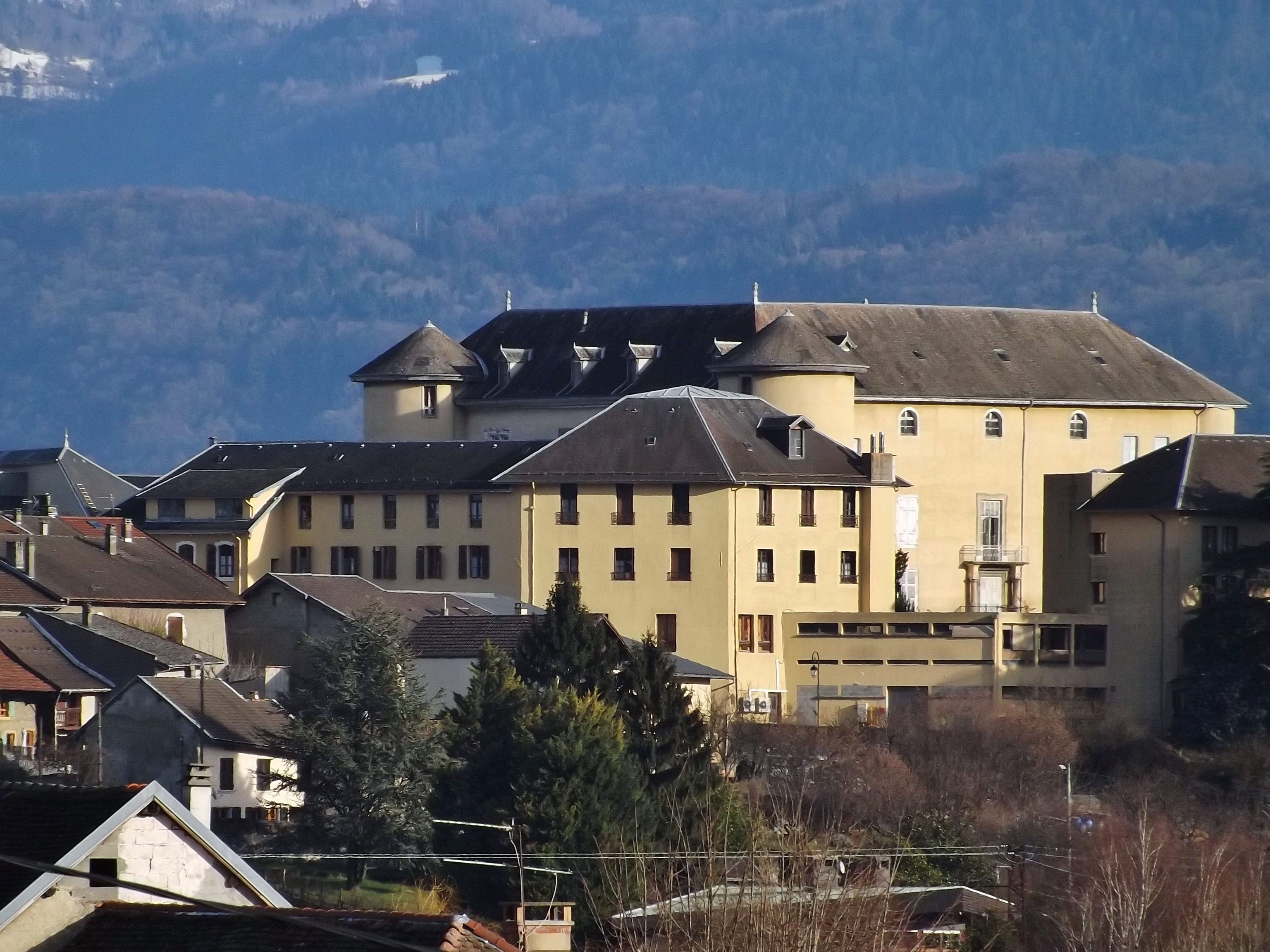
The Château des Marches, de Bellegarde's family seat, served as the headquarters of Sardinian forces during the French invasion of Savoy.

The Kingdom of Sardinia declared war on revolutionary France on 21 September 1792, the day after the French victory at the Battle of Valmy. On the night of 21–22 September, French troops under the Marquis de Montesquiou, led by a unit of Savoyard expatriates known as the Légion des Allobroges, entered Savoy, which was abandoned without resistance by the Sardinian army. By 4 October, the French were in total control: the advancing Montesquiou wrote from Chambéry that "the tricolore cockade is displayed everywhere", and modern historians have noted the apparent enthusiasm of the Savoyard public for annexation by France.

The administration of Savoy passed to a hastily gathered popular assembly known as the National Assembly of the Allobroges, which issued a decree in October threatening to confiscate the property of those exiles who did not return by 26 December. Friedrich, who was still in the Sardinian army, agreed with Adèle and Aurore that the women would return to Savoy, leaving their children with him in Piedmont. Savoy was annexed to France on 27 November: the two sisters had returned to Chambéry by 1 December, when they registered their return with the municipal government. When asked about her husband, de Bellegarde claimed to know neither his whereabouts nor his intentions, and to have no responsibility for his absence. The sisters regained both the Château des Marches and the family's hôtel in Chambéry, and made them available to revolutionary "Popular Societies".

== Revolutionary Savoy (1792–1793) ==
Following the annexation of Savoy, the National Assembly sent a delegation of four commissioners to organise the new administrative Département de Mont-Blanc, which would be centred upon Chambéry. The commissioners were Hérault de Séchelles, Grégoire Jagot, Henri Grégoire and Philibert Simond, a native of the region. The delegates arrived on 14 December alongside the general François Christophe de Kellermann, who replaced Montesquiou as commander of the French Army of the Alps and established his headquarters in Chambéry. The de Bellegardes hosted the commissioners in the Château des Marches, and they were subsequently given apartments in the family's hôtel.

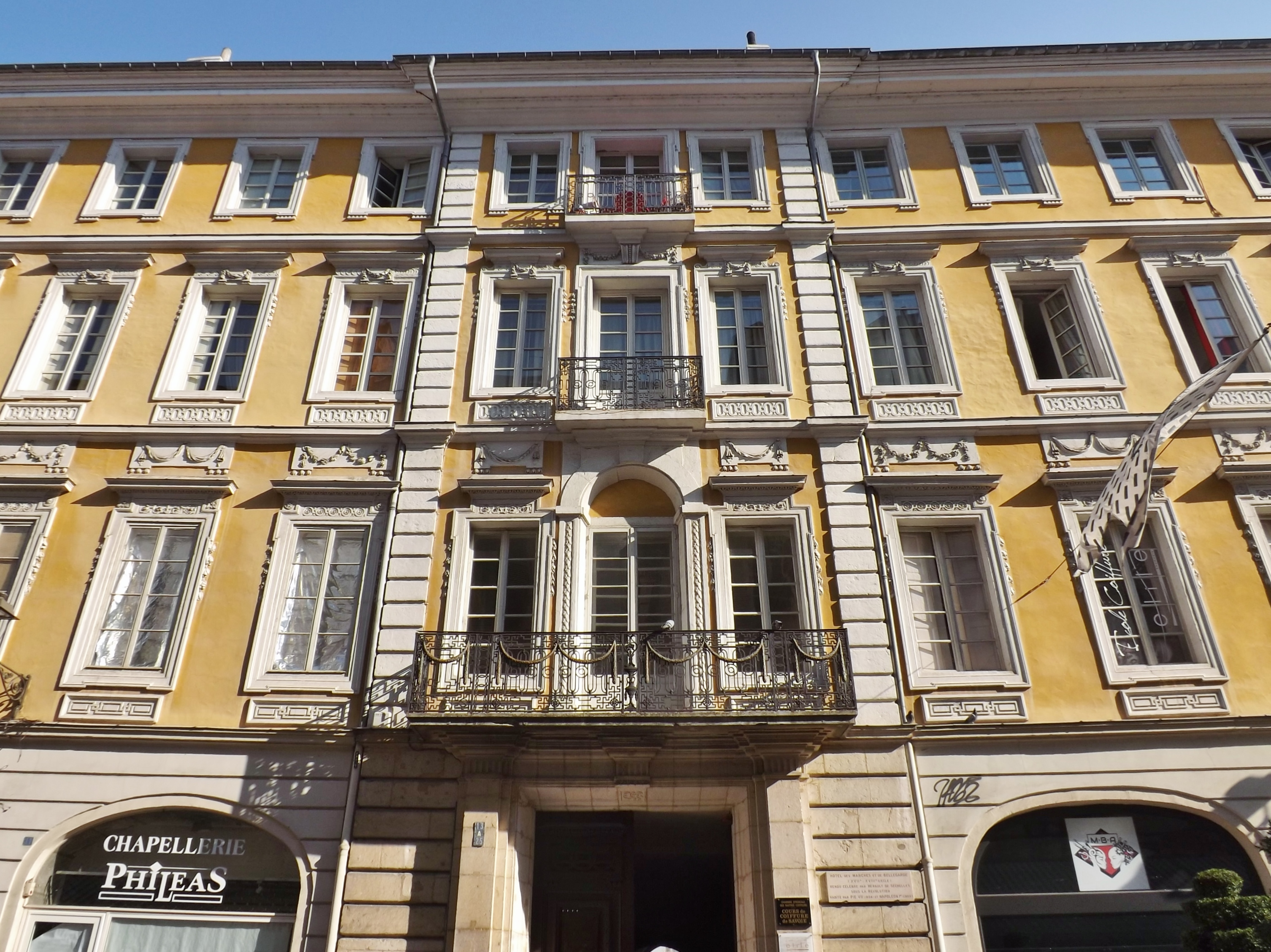
The Hôtel des Marches in Chambéry, which frequently served as the de Bellegardes' residence in the town.

Throughout late 1792 and into 1793, revolutionary violence increased across France, leading into what became known as "The Reign of Terror". Louis XVI was executed on 23 January 1793; in the remainder of France, at least fifty Savoyards were executed, while others were killed in the region, which ordered — but does not appear to have used — a guillotine from Paris. De Bellegarde and de Séchelles became lovers during this period, and rumours arose in Chambéry that the sixteen-year-old Aurore had likewise begun a relationship with Simond — a defrocked priest who, at thirty-eight, was more than twice her age — which attached to her the unflattering nickname of "the Simonette". (Note: That is, "little Simond". Daudet doubted the truth of the latter rumour, which he attributed to hearsay spread by the memoirs of Alexis Billiet, written some seventy years after the fact.) The lavish hospitality shown by the sisters to their guests was also a source of intrigue: the de Bellegardes organised parties in honour of the delegates, and Kellerman is said to have boastfully remarked, after a stay at the château, that "l'hospitalité y était aussi complète que possible" ("their hospitality was as complete as could be"). The sisters' influence with the commissioners has been credited with protecting several Savoyard aristocrats from execution, and securing their release from prison.

The de Bellegarde sisters, perhaps aware of the dangers of being labelled as "aristocrats", hosted parties and gatherings for revolutionary leaders in both their hôtel and at their château. They took to wearing sans-culotte clothing and kept company with a revolutionary known as "Princess Pistol". On 18 May 1793, de Séchelles and Simond, whose zealous application of revolutionary law had made them widely despised in Savoy, left for Paris, accompanied by Adèle and Aurore. Adèle's husband, Friedrich, was stationed in command of a grenadier regiment at the Little St Bernard Pass: his fellow officer, the marquis Henry-Joseph Costa, informed Friedrich of the news, which he had heard from his own wife living near Chambéry. This was the first that Friedrich had heard of his wife since March, when Adèle's letters had ceased. According to Costa's great-grandson, Charles-Albert, de Bellegarde was heartened to learn that she was not dead, "but would have preferred that his wife were somewhere other than Paris." Whether Costa informed de Bellegarde of his wife's infidelity is unknown.

== Paris: The Reign of Terror (1793–1794) ==
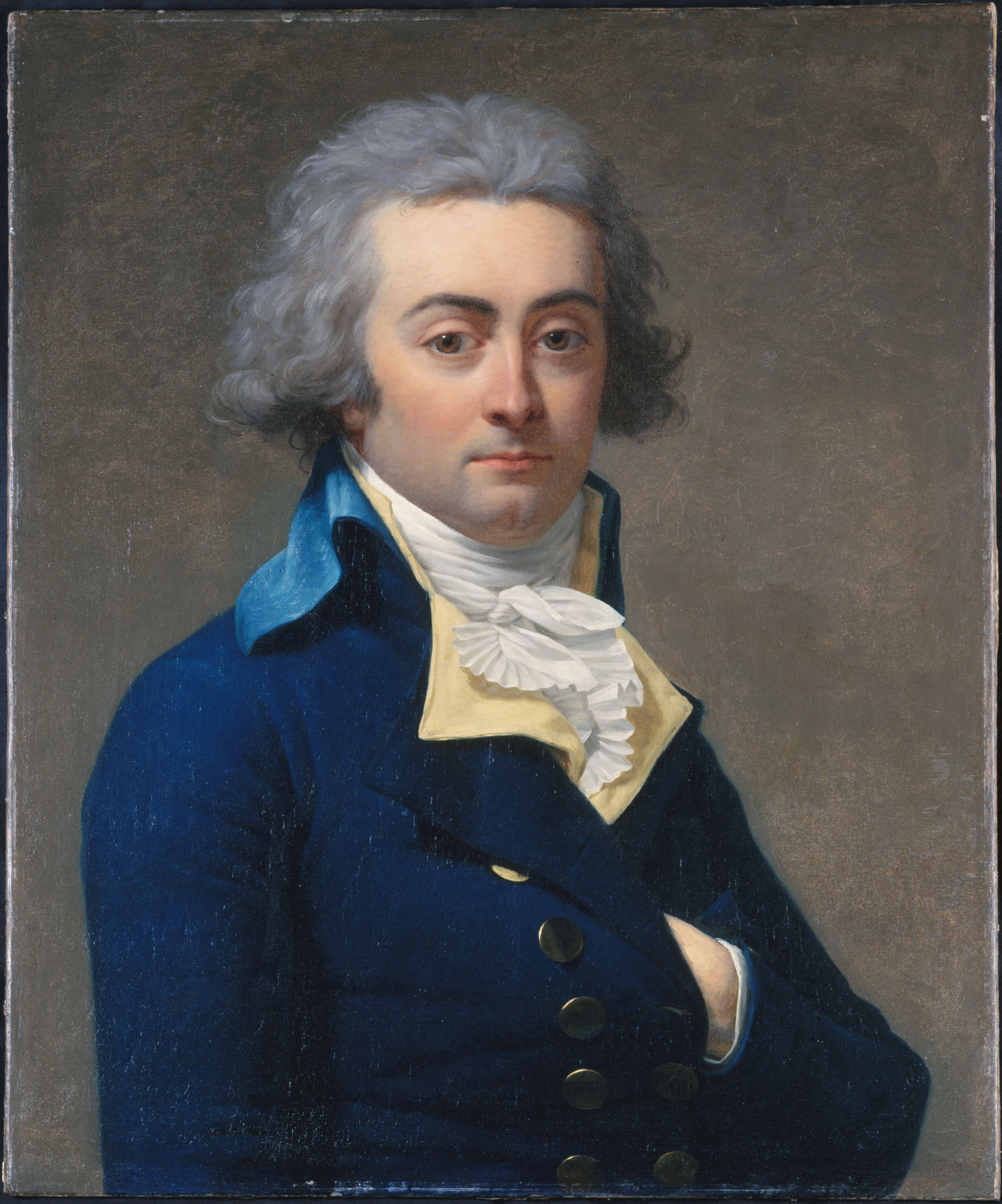
Hérault de Séchelles, painted by Jean-Louis Laneuville c. 1793

The journey from Chambéry to Paris took about a week. De Séchelles moved into the house of his grandmother, Hélène Moreau de Séchelles, on the Rue Basse-du-Rempart. It is possible that de Bellegarde moved in with him, at least initially, (Note: After de Séchelles' arrest, papers seized at his home mentioned a citoyenne ("female citizen") who appeared to have rooms there, but did not specify her identity.) though Merlin states that she rented an apartment. The de Bellegarde sisters lived openly and took an active part in Parisian society: de Coigny later wrote "la jolie figure, la jeunesse plaisaient à tous les yeux" ("their pretty appearance and their youth were pleasing to everyone's eyes"). Around 1793, de Bellegarde held a fashionable salon in Paris. At some point in the same year, they purchased a château in Chenoise, which had previously been the home of their mother's family but had been confiscated after their uncle, Louis Charles d'Hervilly, fled France as an émigré.

The sisters became closely acquainted with the aristocrat and artist Pulchérie de Valence, then known as "citizen Brûlart", and other members of Parisian high society. By October, they were living in a house with de Valence. The three women also formed a close friendship with Rouget de Lisle, the composer of La Marseillaise, with whom they dined frequently and to whom Adèle wrote several letters. De Bellegarde maintained her correspondence with de Lisle after he was arrested for his royalist sympathies and imprisoned in 1793. On the day of his arrest, de Lisle wrote to de Bellegarde, seeking her help in persuading de Séchelles — whom de Lisle believed had ordered it — to have him set free; she wrote back that he could not help, but attempted to assure de Lisle that de Séchelles had played no part in the matter. De Valence was also arrested and imprisoned, probably in February or March 1794.

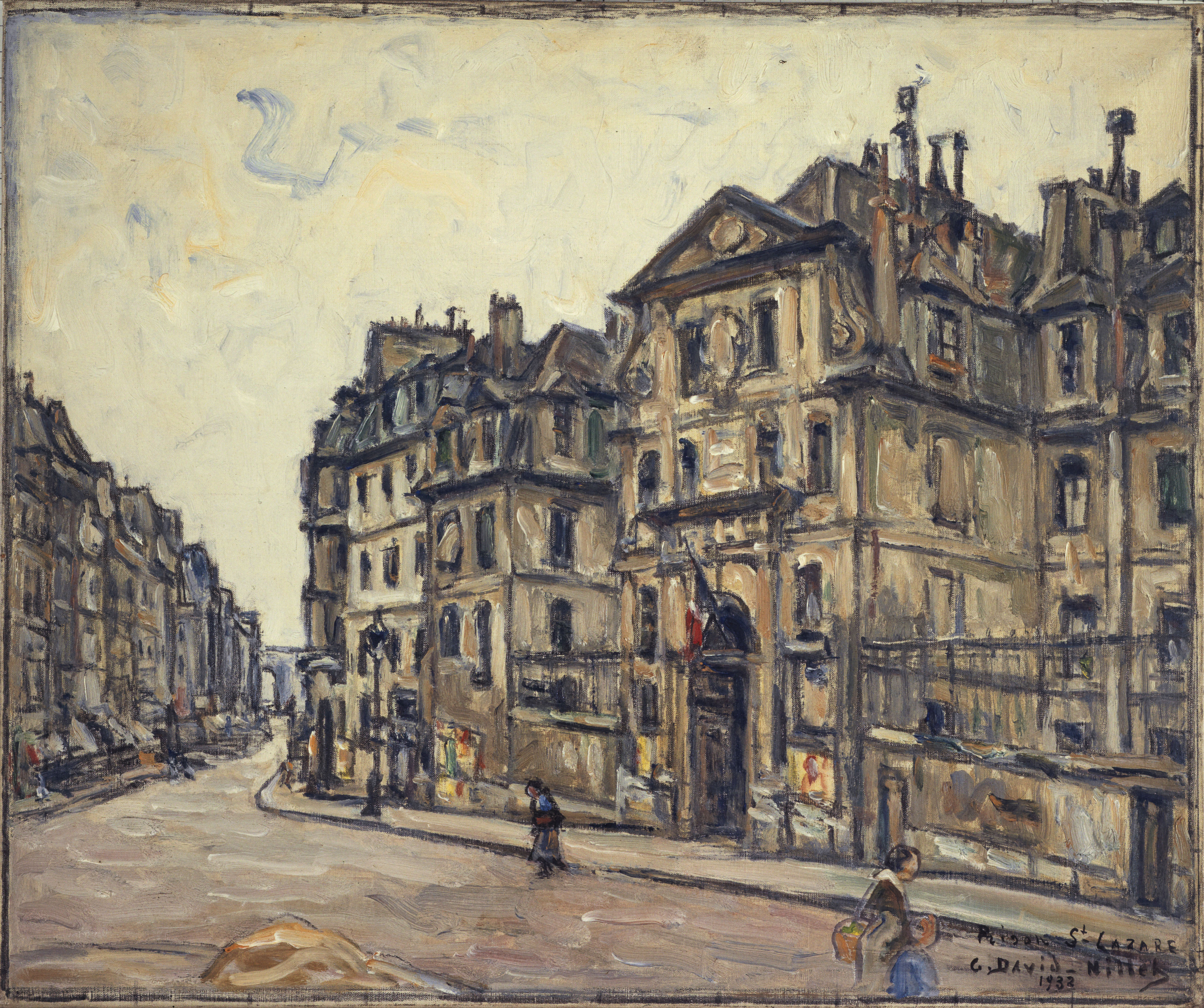
The Saint-Lazare prison, where de Bellegarde was held between April and July 1793, painted in 1932

De Séchelles was considered an ally of Georges Danton, whom Maximilien Robespierre (a leading figure of the Committee of Public Safety, France's de facto government) believed to working with foreign powers to subvert the revolution. Along with other so-called "Dantonists", de Séchelles was arrested on 16 March 1794 and imprisoned in the Luxembourg Palace alongside Philibert Simond, who was taken there on the same day. De Bellegarde wrote on 17 March to Charles-Alexis Alexandre, a high-ranking officer in the National Guard whom she knew from his time in Savoy with the Army of the Alps, attempting to prove de Séchelles' innocence, but seems to have received no response. De Séchelles was executed by guillotine on 5 April: according to Antoine-Vincent Arnault, a woman's hand, which Daudet suspected to have been de Bellegarde's, was seen bidding him farewell from the window of a nearby building. In the aftermath of de Séchelles' execution, several members of his family and a number of his associates were arrested, and some were executed. Simond was guillotined on 10 April.

On 23 April, the de Bellegarde sisters were arrested, according to the Committee of Public Safety, "par mesure de sûreté générale" ("as a public security measure"). Vermale suggests that Adèle was suspected of spying for Sardinia. They were held in the Saint-Lazare prison until 27 July. During this period, which seems to have been fairly comfortable, they met and befriended other aristocratic women imprisoned alongside them, including their long-term friend Aimée de Coigny. The fall of Maximilien Robespierre in July prompted a widespread release of prisoners detained under the "Reign of Terror", including the de Bellegarde sisters and de Lisle; Coigny, who had been condemned to death, had already been released through the intercession of her future husband, Casimir, Comte de Montrond. According to Armand Praviel, de Bellegarde, as with other prominent aristocratic women of the period, "only escaped the guillotine by chance."

== Later life (1794–1820) ==
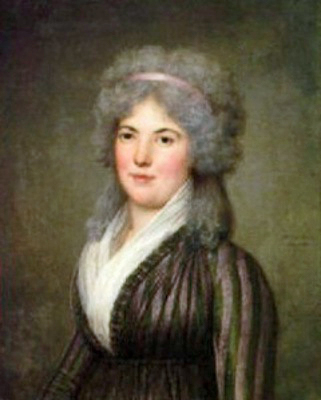
Aimée de Coigny, painted before 1811

After their release, the de Bellegarde sisters lived together with de Coigny in an apartment on the Rue d'Amboise, and also rented a country house in Épinay-sur-Orge. Later, they moved to 8 Rue du Jardinet in Passy. They were prominent in salon culture, and frequently called on exclusive and fashionable hostesses such as Thérésa Tallien, Germaine de Staël and the future empress Josephine Beauharnais. Their own salon was popular with artists and intellectuals, and, according to de Coigny, was one of the first to resume salon culture after the Terror. They hosted notables such as Thomas-Alexandre Dumas, Kellerman and Alexandre — all of whom, as Adèle complained in a letter to de Lisle, she found excruciatingly boring. The de Bellegarde sisters came into the acquaintance of the Vicomtesse de Laval, an aristocratic hostess and former mistress of the prominent diplomat Talleyrand, who (according to Coigny) "en fit aussitôt ses esclaves" ("immediately made them [the de Bellegardes] her slaves"), and on whose encouragement the sisters organised regular dinners with a group of influential artistic and literary figures, including Népomucène Lemercier, Alexandre Duval, François Gérard, and Talleyrand, which they continued for around five years.

On 7 October 1794, (Note: Daudet gives the same date with the year as 1793, but this predates the law under which he says that she obtained the divorce.) taking advantage of the law of 23 April (Note: That is, in the Revolutionary calendar, 4 floréal of Year II.) which allowed the spouses of émigrés to obtain a divorce unilaterally, de Bellegarde was granted a divorce from Friedrich, which he contested until at least 1804. (Note: Friedrich contested the divorce: see Personal life and relationships below.) In the winter of 1797, the sisters returned to Savoy, staying in Chambéry until February 1798. Vermale suggests that they may have taken part in the ball thrown by Talleyrand for Napoleon on 15 January 1798, celebrating the general's return from Italy, to which he invited "les plus jolies femmes de Paris, les plus élégantes" ("the prettiest and most elegant women in Paris"), who attended in Greco-Roman costume.

=== After the Republic (1804–1830) ===
After Napoleon's coronation in December 1804, de la Fuye writes, the de Bellegardes "waged … a campaign of resistance in the manner of Mme. de Staël", whose network of contacts and salon-goers (known as the Coppet group) has been described as a "centre on the periphery" in opposition to Napoleonic Paris. Their long-time associate Talleyrand had, since at least 1808, been convinced that Napoleon would eventually be defeated and secretly working with foreign powers against him; in Vermale's analysis, the de Bellegarde's turned most significantly against Napoleon in 1812, during the failed French invasion of Russia. According to an anecdote told by Élisabeth Vigée Le Brun, who visited their salon during the period, the sisters read a newspaper report on the retreat from Moscow: seeing that it ended with an optimistic comment about the emperor's health, they "jetèrent le journal au feu d'indignation" ("threw the newspaper away in a blaze of indignation"). A prominent figure in their social circle during this period was Bruno-Gabriel de Boisgelin, a military officer and royalist who became a lover of Aimée de Coigny: Vermale credits him with converting the de Bellegardes to his political views.

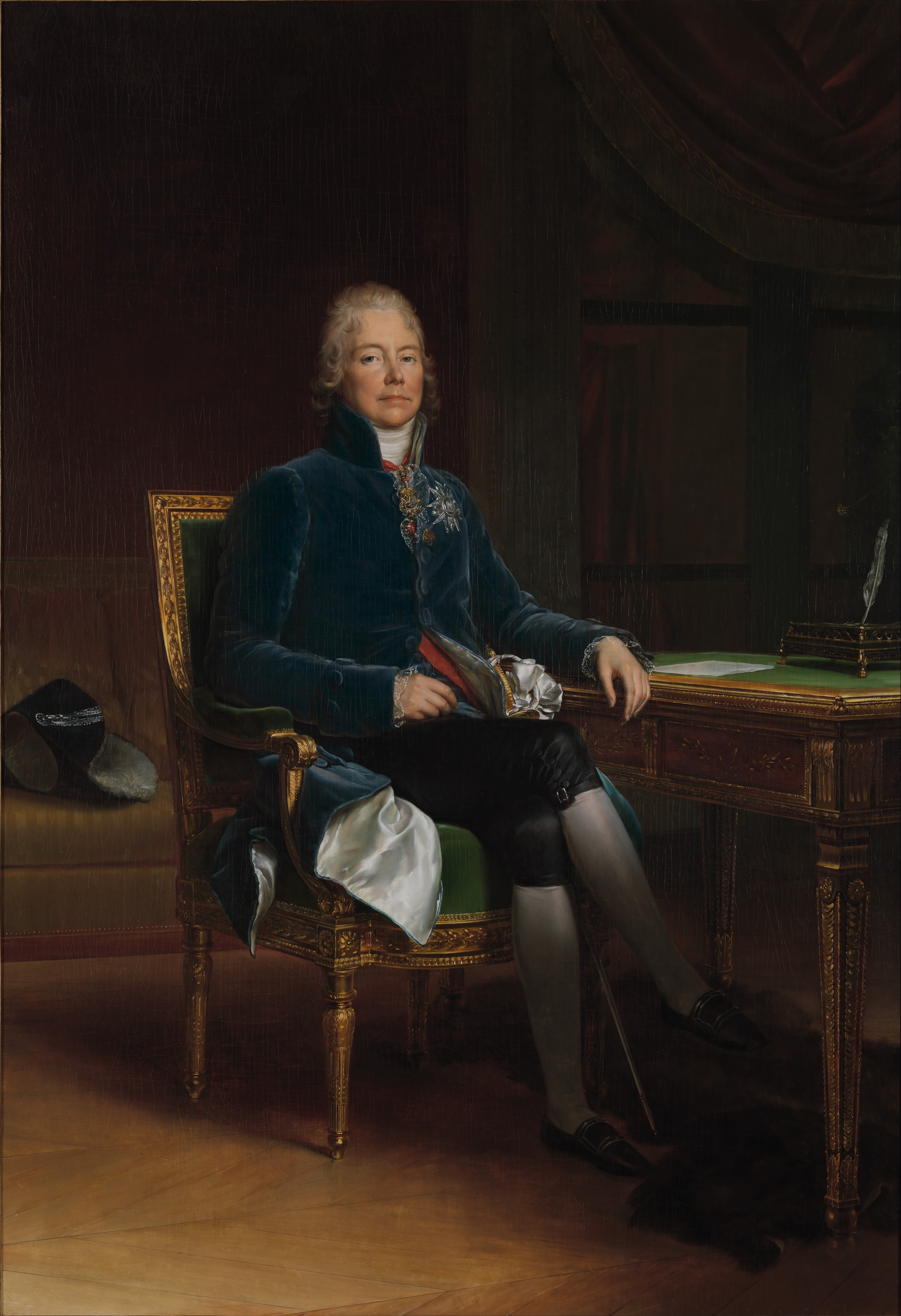
Talleyrand, painted here in 1808 by de Bellegarde's associate Gérard, was a prominent patron of de Bellegarde in the Napoleonic period.

After the Bourbon restoration of 1814, they left Paris for the Château des Marches, which had been returned to Sardinia following Napoleon's defeat. For the most part, they lived quietly, though they gained a reputation as royalists. In September, they joined a group of Savoyards in Chambéry (which was still under French control) agitating for the region to remain part of France. During Napoleon's brief return to power during the Hundred Days in 1815, the Château des Marches was the headquarters of Colonel Pierre Marin Durand of the 11^{e} Régiment de Ligne, one of the few officers in the south-east to remain loyal to the royalist government in Paris. The de Bellegardes took refuge in Nyon in Switzerland. While there, they met Alphonse de Lamartine, who would become famous in the 1820s as a poet, and interceded on his behalf in a quarrel with a Bernese officer, who had spoken in praise of Napoleon.

After the Battle of Waterloo in June 1815, de Bellegarde and Aurore visited de Staël at Coppet, then returned to France. They lived for a while in Épinay-sur-Orge with de Coigny; afterwards, they divided their time between winters in Paris and summers in Chenoise. There, de la Fuye records that "elles seront la providence des malheureux" ("they were the providence of the unfortunate"), to whom they opened their home alongside the elite of French society. Frequent visitors included Talleyrand, the Dukes of Polignac and Louis Henri, Prince of Condé, who maintained a set of hunting equipment there. They were also known for their public balls, held in front of their château.

In later life, both sisters turned to religion, and Aurore became a "Canoness of the Royal Chapel of Saint Anne of Munich" in 1826. A regular caller at their house was the royalist political theorist turned priest Antoine Eugène Genoud, who mentioned the de Bellegarde sisters in his memoirs and acted as a tutor to Adèle's son Louis.

De Bellegarde died on 7 January 1830 in Paris, at her son's apartment on Rue Voltaire. In her will, she expressed her wish to be buried in the churchyard at Chenoise, without expense, and that a hundred francs be given to the poor. After her death, Aurore placed a stone in the churchyard with an inscription in Adèle's memory and the words "priez pour celle qui vous aimait" ("pray for her that loved you"), but the location of her tomb is unknown. Aurore died on 7 March 1840, and was buried in Montmartre Cemetery.

== Work with Jacques-Louis David ==
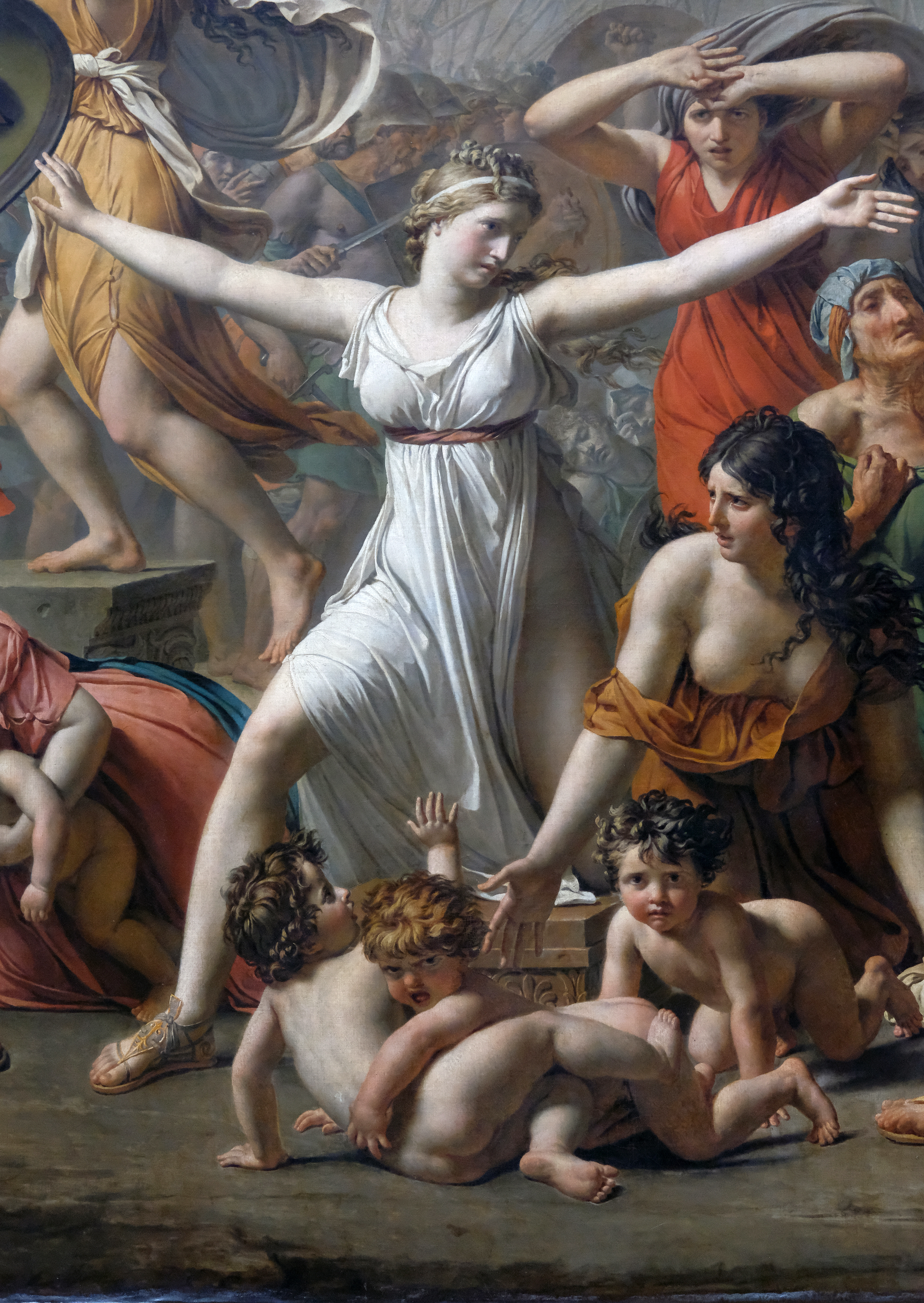
Detail from The Intervention of the Sabine Women: the face and hairstyle of the figure crouching to the right are de Bellegarde's, while her sister Aurore modelled for Hersilia, seen in the centre.

Jacques-Louis David began planning The Intervention of the Sabine women during his imprisonment in the Palais du Luxembourg from 29 May to 3 August 1795. According to a popular account, he was inspired to paint it in honour of his then-estranged wife, Charlotte, after she visited him there. He began preparations shortly after his release, in the autumn of 1795, assisted in his research by his student Pierre-Maximilien Delafontaine. From February 1796, he worked in a temporary studio in the Louvre, and later moved to premises on the Champs-Élysées, where his meeting with the de Bellegardes took place.

The female models for The Intervention of the Sabine Women were aristocratic women, whose appearances David blended with those of Classical sculptures. Numerous apocryphal anecdotes arose in Paris about their involvement in the painting, particularly regarding how David came to meet the de Bellegarde sisters, which have been described as part of the painting's "legend".

Aurore de Bellegarde became David's model for Hersilia, while Adèle modelled for the crouching figure seen to her right. Sources disagree as to how the arrangement began: in the version reported by Miette de Villars in 1850, the sisters and Thérésa Tallien, by then a leading figure in Parisian high society, heard that David had been struggling to find female models and visited his studio in the nude, offering to model for Hersilia. David is said to have exclaimed "Mesdames, me voilà comme Pâris devant les trois grâces!" ("Mesdames, here I am like Paris in front of the three Graces!"). In a second version reported by David's student Étienne-Jean Delécluze in 1855, the de Bellegardes were brought to the studio by Madame de Noailles, (Note: Her identity is unknown, as Delécluze does not specify her first name: Daudet claims that there were three women with that surname in Paris at the time, but to have been unable to ascertain which Delécluze intended.) a friend of David's, and caught the painter's attention with their long and beautiful hairstyles. Certainly, both de Bellegarde sisters were well known among the Parisian art world, and for their acquaintance with artists of various genres.

In de Villars' version, David was most taken by Aurore, who sat for Hersitia, only asking Adèle and Tallien to pose "out of politeness". According to Delécluze, however, it was Adèle's long, dark hair that most interested him: at the time, he had already painted the crouching figure next to Hersitia (which had been completed by October 1796), and expressed regret that he had not had de Bellegarde's face as a model from which to do so. De Bellegarde accordingly allowed him to repaint the figure's face and hair after her own, while he used part of Aurore's leg in his figure of Hersitia. David's use of the de Bellegarde sisters as models has been interpreted as creating a link between the mythological Sabine Women and Parisian women of his own time, which has itself been interpreted as "affording a familial basis for the reconciliation of a divided and warring post-Revolutionary France".

According to Delécluze, the attention David paid to the painting of Adèle's face led to rumours of an affair between her and the painter, which Delécluze considered baseless. Other rumours circulated as to whether she had posed fully nude.

The Intervention of the Sabine Women was first exhibited at the Louvre on 21 December 1799, a few weeks after the Coup of 18 Brumaire, in what has been described as "the major artistic event of the late 1790s in Paris." Contemporaries recorded that Adèle and Aurore de Bellegarde attended the Paris Opera on the opening night of the exhibition, with their clothing and hair modelled after their appearances in the painting. The two women have been a focal point of twenty-first century scholarship on the painting. The diaphanous gowns worn by their characters were credited for starting a fashion for similar outfits, known as dresses à la antique ("Ancient-style") among Parisian high society. Such dresses formed part of the "Greek Revival" Directoire style of women's clothing popular during the Directoire period, a trend closely associated with the de Bellegardes' friend Thérésa Tallien and the aristocratic subculture known as the merveilleuses ("marvellous women").

== Personal life and relationships ==
=== Marriage to Friedrich de Bellegarde ===
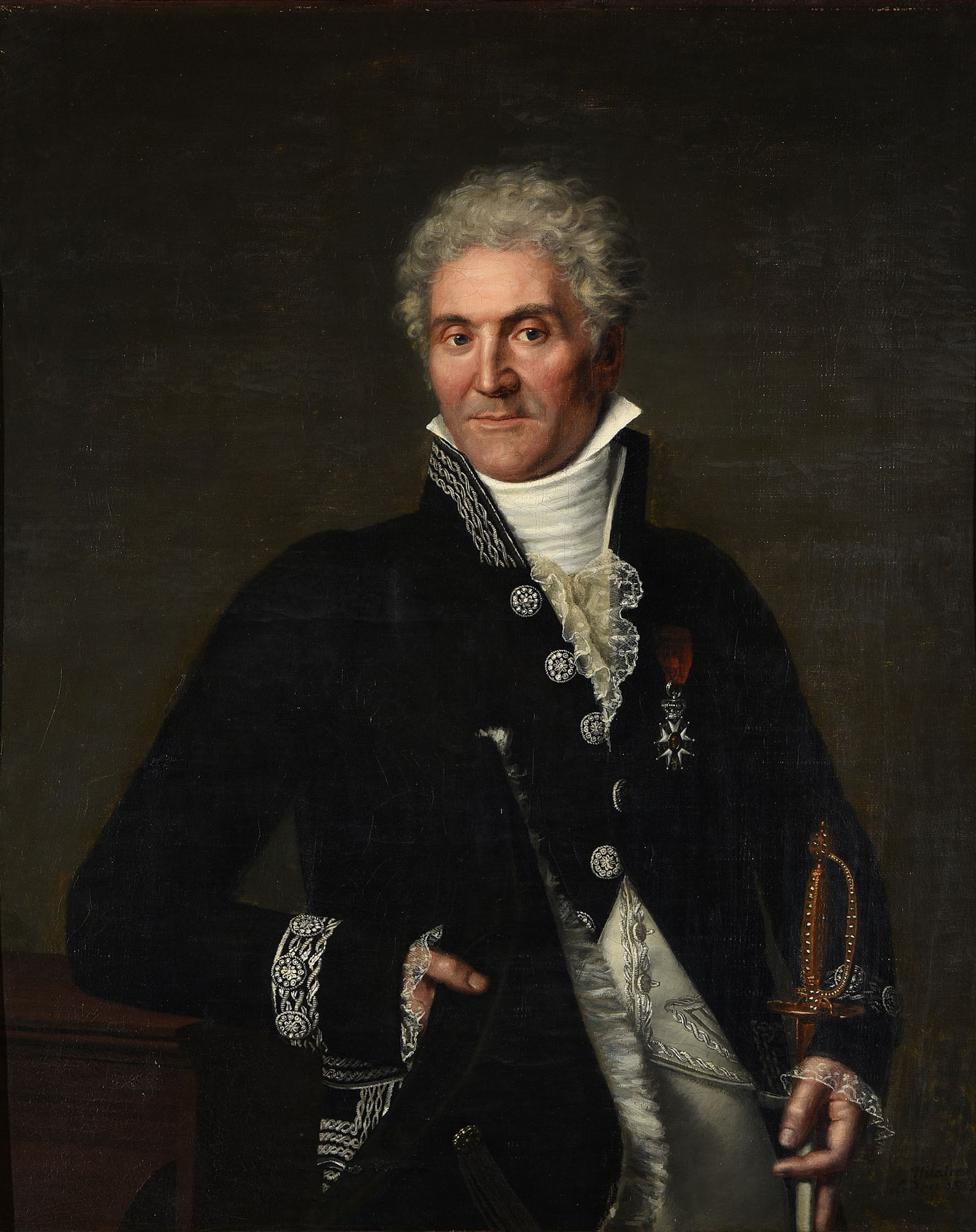
Merlin de Douai, painted by Hilaire Ledru in 1812

De Bellegarde married her cousin Friedrich in 1787, and had a son and a daughter with him by 1791. She secured a divorce on 7 October 1794. To do so, she obtained an acte de notoriété ("act of notoriety") from six citizens of Paris, which attested that Friedrich had abandoned her in Chambéry, that they had been estranged for more than two years, and that he had sent her no news during this period. On Adèle's release from prison in 1794, Friedrich wrote to her, via his servant, in German, demanding that she nullify the divorce. After the signing of the Treaty of Paris in 1796, which established peace between Sardinia and France but confirmed the loss of Savoy, Friedrich moved into the service of Austria, where he was seriously wounded at the Battle of Marengo, but rose to the rank of lieutenant-general and became a chamberlain to Emperor Francis II in Vienna. In 1797 or 1798, (Note: The revolutionary Year VI, which began on 22 September 1797 and ended on 22 September 1798.) Friedrich's name was formally inscribed on a list of émigrés, placing a sequester on his property which he managed to overturn on 9 June 1798.

On 17 April 1802, de Bellegarde sold the hôtel in Chambéry, without consulting Friedrich, who saw the property as his by marriage. In March 1803, Friedrich returned to Paris: on 27 April, he obtained a judgement stating that, based on the 1798 ruling, he had never been an émigré, and so Adèle could not consider him estranged; therefore, the judgement stated that she had in fact abandoned him, and so had no right to divorce under French law. Adèle appealed to the grand-juge, the Minister of Justice Philippe-Antoine Merlin de Douai, who referred the matter to Napoleon. Napoleon wrote back on 10 November 1804 that the 1798 decision to return Friedrich's property rights had been "purely administrative", and so could not be used to support his claim for the nullification of the divorce, and referred the matter back to a lower court. Friedrich's suit was ultimately unsuccessful. He returned to Paris and met with Adèle in a notary's office to negotiate terms: after several meetings, the two signed an agreement on 3 April 1805 that Friedrich would no longer seek an annulment of the divorce, that the ownership of the Château des Marches would pass to Adèle and Friedrich's children, and that Adèle would enjoy the use of it for life. According to Daudet, they never saw each other again. Friedrich de Bellegarde died in Graz in January 1830, a few days after Adèle and shortly after the death in childbirth of their daughter.

=== Lovers, friends and family ===
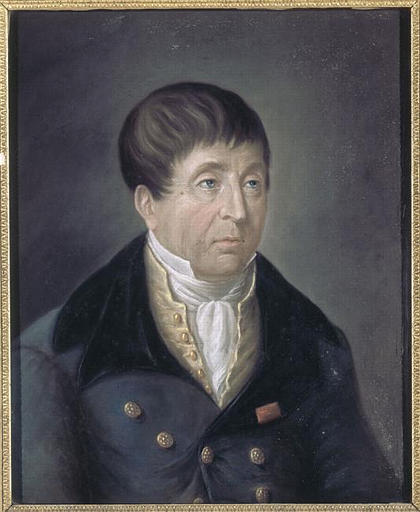
Rouget de Lisle — known as "Lili" in de Bellegarde's letters — portrayed in 1835

The de Bellegarde sisters were both celebrated for their beauty and condemned for their "scandalous" sexual behaviour. Both Adèle and Aurore had many admirers among influential Parisian men, including the Minister of War Aubert du Bayet, who declared himself "mad" about them, and Boutier de Catus — a military officer and a significant figure in the prosecution that had led to de Séchelles' execution — whose marriage proposal Adèle refused in 1796.

Their reputation played a significant role in contemporary debates as women's visibility in society, as well as their sexual rights and mores, which were themselves significant to the politics and ideology of the revolutionary Republic. In the words of the art historian Darcy Grimaldo Grigsby:

In post-Thermidor France, women's visibility seemed not only to flaunt their difference from men but also to constitute the very source of their power and dominance. For a Revolutionary like Roederer, the difference of women only too clearly represented a difference of politics, the haunting specter of the fraternal Republic's antithesis: women's lawlessness — like fashion, like tyranny, like immorality — fully outside men's lawful governance. How then could David's Intervention of the Sabines propose that the fashionable woman serve as an exemplary model? Was this what Revolutionary utopian aspirations had come to? That promiscuous unregulated women like the Bellegarde sisters, Fortunée Hamelin, Thérésa Tallien, Josephine Beauharnais, and Anne-Françoise Lange should offer models of distinction, a distinction of fashion rather than morality?

Through Aimée de Coigny, who invited him to Épinay in autumn 1800, de Bellegarde met and began a relationship with the operatic singer Pierre-Jean Garat. They had two children: a son, Léon or Louis, (Note: Cajon gives "Louis", Vermale gives "Léon", and Daudet uses both.) on 16 October 1801, and a daughter on 16 July 1802. (Note: Daudet gives the daughter's name as "Pauline"; Vermale gives it as "Marie Aurore Aimée".) De Bellegarde and Garat's relationship ended shortly after the birth of their daughter, who was brought up by Garat: Louis was adopted by Aurore and took the name Louis de Chenoise, after the de Bellegardes' maternal family seat. In 1815, de Chenoise enlisted in the army of Louis Antoine, Duke of Angoulême, who was fighting against Napoleon on behalf of Louis XVIII: after the Second Bourbon Restoration, de Chenoise joined the French army in 1816, serving until 1833 as a cavalry officer. He died, childless, in 1837.

De Bellegarde maintained a long-term correspondence and friendship with Rouget de Lisle, to whom she referred in her letters as "Lili". His 1797 essay Adelaide et Monville was dedicated to the de Bellegardes. She had a particularly close relationship with her sister, Aurore. In her will of December 1826, Adèle wrote: "I will never in this world be able to repay my sister all that I owe to her … God will reward her for all the good which her generous friendship has done for me, for all her generosity on my account, for her patience and her kindness. I add to this recognition the gift of all that I can give."

== Bibliography ==
=== Primary sources (memoirs and personal reflections) ===
- Costa de Beauregard, Charles-Albert (1878). Un homme d'autrefois (in French) (3rd ed.). Paris: E. Plon et cie.
- de Coigny, Aimée (1902). Lamy, Étienne (ed.). Mémoires de Aimée de Coigny (in French). Paris: Calmann-Lévy.
- Delécluze, Étienne-Jean (1855). Louis David: Son École et Son Temps (in French). Paris: Bonaventure and Ducessois.

=== Secondary and academic sources ===
- Bordes, Phillipe (2022). Jacques-Louis David: Radical Draftsman. New Haven: Yale University Press. ISBN 9781588397461.
- Bordes, Phillipe (2005). Jacques-Louis David: Empire to Exile. New Haven: Yale University Press. ISBN 9780300104479.
- Baine, Rodney M.; Williams, Mary E. (1985). "Oglethorpe's Missing Years". The Georgia Historical Quarterly. 69 (2): 193–210. JSTOR 40581354.
- Burton, Richard D.E. (2008). Blood in the City: Violence and Revelation in Paris, 1789–1945. New York: Cornell University Press. ISBN 9780801438684.
- Cajon, Pierre (1964). "les anciens propriétaires du château de Chenoise: Les Dames de Bellegarde, châtelaines de Chenoise". Bulletin de la Société d'histoire et d'archéologie de l'arrondissement de Provins (in French) (118): 53–62.
- Chisholm, Hugh, ed. (1911), "Montrond, Casimir, Comte de" , Encyclopædia Britannica, vol. 18 (11th ed.), Cambridge University Press, pp. 792–793
- Dard, Émile (1907). Un épicurien sous la Terreur: Hérault de Séchelles (1759-1794) d'après des documents inédits (in French). Paris: Perrin and Co.
- Daudet, Ernest (1904). Le roman d'un conventionnel: Herault de Séchelles et les dames de Bellegarde (in French). Paris.
- Daudet, Ernest (1903a). "Les Dames de Bellegarde: Mœurs des temps de la Révolution: I: Autour du Château des Marches" . Revue des Deux Mondes (journal). 5 (in French). 17: 570–603 – via Wikisource.
- Daudet, Ernest (1903b). "Les Dames de Bellegarde: Mœurs des temps de la Révolution: II: La genèse d'une terroriste" . Revue des Deux Mondes (journal). 5 (in French). 17: 864–899 – via Wikisource.
- Daudet, Ernest (1903c). "Les Dames de Bellegarde: Mœurs des temps de la Révolution: III: La fin d'un roman d'amour" . Revue des Deux Mondes (journal). 5 (in French). 18: 407–444 – via Wikisource.
- Davies, Norman (2014). Europe: A History. London: Random House. ISBN 9781847922908.
- de la Fuye, Maurice (1939). "Idylle révolutionnaire: Adèle de Bellegarde et Rouget de Lisle". La revue des deux mondes (in French). Paris: 675–692. Archived from the original on 13 February 2023.
- d'Hauterive, Borel (1861). "Nobiliaire de Savoie". Annuaire de la noblesse de France et des maisons souveraines de l'Europe (in French). Vol. 18. Paris: Au Bureau de la Publication. pp. 373–389.
- de Villars, Miette (1850). Mémoires de David: Peintre et Député à La Convention (in French). Paris.
- Duvignau, Raphael Matta (2012). "Le Comité de salut public (6 avril 1793 - 4 brumaire an IV)". La Révolution française (in French). 3 (3). doi:10.4000/lrf.773.
- Fremont-Barnes, Gregory (2013). The French Revolutionary Wars. London: Taylor and Francis. ISBN 9781135977412.
- Garlatti, Ghislain (2007). Histoire des Marches: À l'ombre du Granier, chronique d'un village de Savoie (in French). Vielle-Rue: la Fontaine de Siloé. ISBN 9782842063436.
- Gover, Louise Juliet (1999). 'Invisibles et presentes par-tout': Re-viewing Women from the Ancient Past in Late Eighteenth-Century French Art (PDF) (Ph.D.). University College London. Archived from the original (PDF) on 12 February 2023.
- Grimaldo Grigsby, Darcy (1998). "Nudity à la grecque in 1799". The Art Bulletin. 80 (2): 311–335. JSTOR 3051235.
- Gueniffey, Patrice (2015). Bonaparte. Harvard University Press. ISBN 9780674368354.
- Halliday, Tony (2006). "The Trouble with Tatius". Oxford Art Journal. 29 (2): 197–211. doi:10.1093/oxartj/kcl002. JSTOR 3841012.
- Hardman, John (2016). The Life of Louis XVI. New Haven: Yale University Press. ISBN 9780300220421.
- Hazan, Eric (2017). A People's History of the French Revolution. London: Verso Books. ISBN 9781781689844.
- Hofmann, Étienne; Rosset, François (2005). Le groupe de Coppet: une constellation d'intellectuels européens (in French). Lausanne: Presses polytechniques et universitaires romandes. ISBN 9782880746650.
- Johnson, Dorothy (2006). "David and Napoleonic Painting". In Johnson, Dorothy (ed.). Jacques-Louis David: New Perspectives. Newark: University of Delaware Press. pp. 131–143. ISBN 9780874139303.
- Kay, Sarah; Cave, Terence; Bowie, Malcolm (2006). A Short History of French Literature. Oxford University Press. ISBN 9780191516221.
- Kolla, Edward James (2017). Sovereignty, International Law, and the French Revolution. Cambridge University Press. ISBN 9781107179547.
- Lajer-Burcharth, Ewa (1999). Necklines: The Art of Jacques-Louis David After the Terror. New Haven: Yale University Press. ISBN 9780300074215.
- Lawday, David (2011). Napoleon's Master: A Life of Prince Talleyrand. London: Random House. ISBN 9781446448786.
- Martin, Jean-Clément (2010). La Terreur, part maudite de la Révolution [The Terror: Cursed Period of the Revolution]. Découvertes Gallimard (in French). Vol. 566. Paris: Gallimard. pp. 14–15.
- Masse, Jules (1913). "Retour de L'Ile d'Elbe, le Colonel Durand du 11e de Ligne". Annales révolutionnaires. 6 (5): 658–675. JSTOR 41920700.
- McPhee, Peter (2012). Robespierre: A Revolutionary Life. New Haven: Yale University Press. ISBN 9780300183672.
- McPhee, Peter (2001). The French Revolution: 1789-1799. Oxford University Press. ISBN 9780191608254.
- Meeks, Joshua (2019). Napoléon Bonaparte: A Reference Guide to His Life and Works. London: Rowman & Littlefield. ISBN 9781538113516.
- Meeks, Joshua (2017). France, Britain, and the Struggle for the Revolutionary Western Mediterranean. Cham: Springer. ISBN 9783319440781.
- Merlin, Philippe-Antoine (1807). Répertoire universel et raisonné de jurisprudence. Vol. 3 (3 ed.). Paris.
- Miquet, François (1904). "Le roman d'un Conventionnel: Hérault de Séchelles et les dames de Bellegarde, par Ernest Daudet (Paris, Hachette)". Revue Savoisienne (in French). 45: 124–129.
- Muther, Richard (1895). The History of Modern Painting. Vol. 1. London: Henry and Co.
- Praviel, Armand (March 1937). "Le destin tragique d'André Chénier". Lectures pour tous: revue universelle et populaire illustrée (in French). pp. 37–50.
- Prothero, George Walter, ed. (1920). Peace Handbooks: Volume 25: Idemnities, Plebiscites &c. London: HM Stationery Office.
- Rapport, Mike (2013). The Napoleonic Wars: A Very Short Introduction. Oxford University Press. ISBN 9780199590964.
- Rauser, Amelia (2020). The Age of Undress: Art, Fashion, and the Classical Ideal in the 1790s. New Haven: Yale University Press. ISBN 9780300241204.
- Roberts, Warren (1992). Jacques-Louis David, Revolutionary Artist: Art, Politics, and the French Revolution. Chapel Hill: The University of North Carolina Press. ISBN 0807843504.
- Sorrel, Christian (2006). Haute-Savoie en images: 1000 ans d'histoire, 1000 images (in French). Les Marches: La Fontaine de Siloé. ISBN 9782842063474.
- Stewart, H. F.; Desjardins, Paul (15 September 2016). French Patriotism in the Nineteenth Century (1814–1833). Cambridge University Press. ISBN 9781316620069.
- Tiersot, Julien (1892). Rouget de Lisle: son oeuvre—sa vie (in French). Paris.
- Triomphe, Pierre (2011). "Genoude, Eugène de". In Martin, Jean-Clément (ed.). Dictionnaire de la Contre-Révolution (in French). Paris: Perrin. pp. 276–277. ISBN 9782262033705.
- Vermale, François (1947). "Les Dames de Bellegarde". Annales historiques de la Révolution française (in French). 19 (107): 218–256. JSTOR 41925440.
