= Genoud =

Genoud is a French-language surname.

People with the name include:

- Antoine Eugène Genoud (1792–1849), French Roman Catholic theologian and politician
- Bernard Genoud (1942–2010), French Roman Catholic Bishop
- François Genoud (1915–1996), Swiss financier
- Philippe Morier-Genoud, French theatre and film actor
