= Psyche Abandoned =

Psyche Abandoned may refer to:

- Psyche Abandoned (painting)
- Psyche Abandoned (sculpture)
