= The Intervention of the Sabine Women =

1799 painting by Jacques-Louis David

- Les Sabines (French)
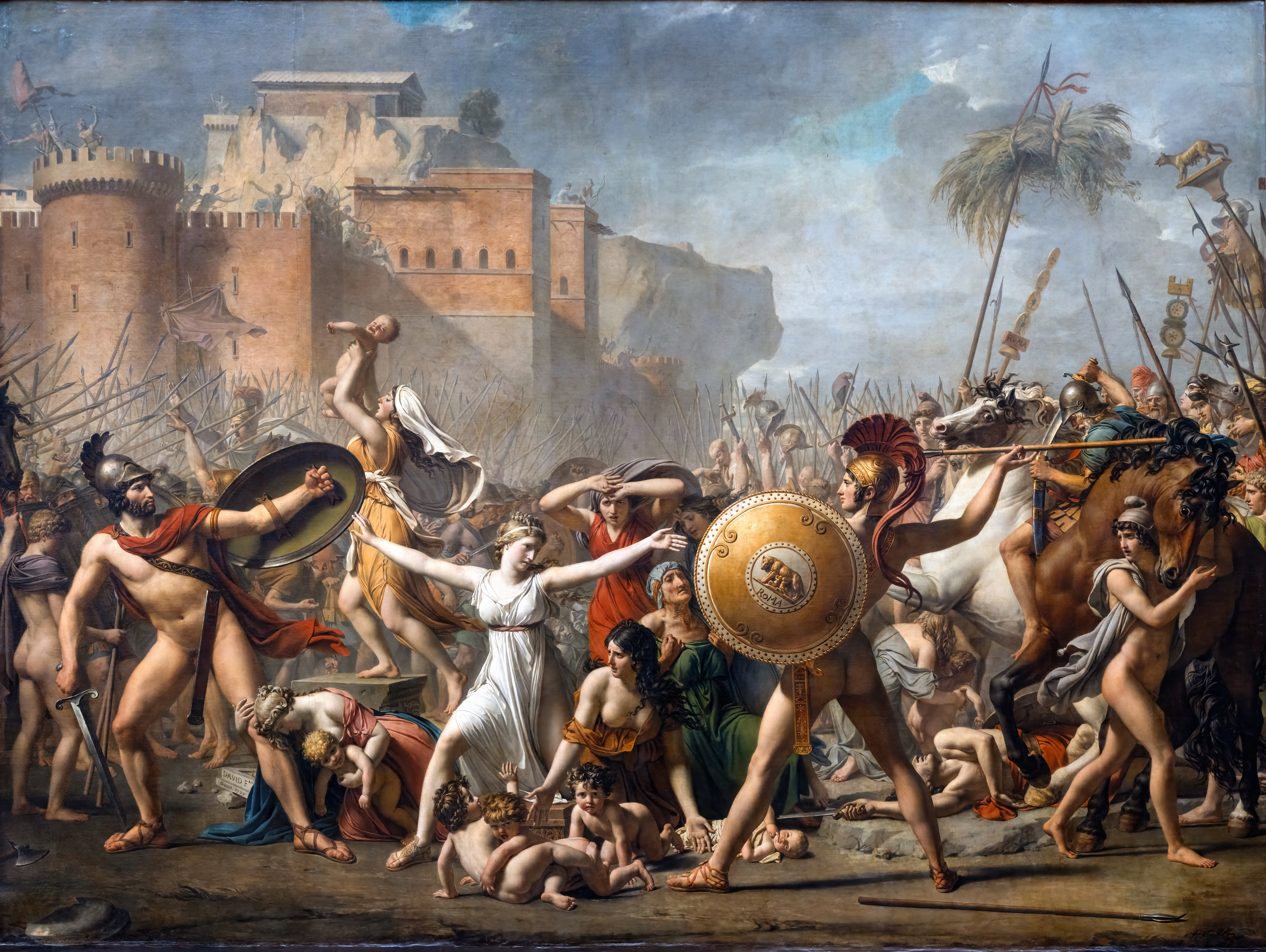
- Artist: Jacques-Louis David
- Year: 1799
- Medium: Oil on canvas
- Movement: Neoclassicism
- Dimensions: 385 cm × 522 cm (152 in × 206 in)
- Location: Louvre, Paris

The Intervention of the Sabine Women (French: Les Sabines (Note: French pronunciation: [le sabin])) is a 1799 painting by the French painter Jacques-Louis David, showing a legendary episode following the abduction of the Sabine women by the founding generation of Rome.

Work on the painting commenced in 1796, after his estranged wife visited him in jail. He conceived the idea of telling the story, to honour his wife, with the theme being love prevailing over conflict and the protection of children. The painting was also seen as a plea for the people to reunite after the bloodshed of the revolution. Its realization took him nearly four years.

== Description ==
67The painting depicts Romulus's wife Hersilia – the daughter of Titus Tatius, leader of the Sabines – rushing between her husband and her father and placing her babies between them. A vigorous Romulus prepares to strike a half-retreating Tatius with his spear, but hesitates.

The rocky outcrop in the background is the Tarpeian Rock, a reference to civil conflict, since the Roman punishment for treason was to be thrown from the rock. According to legend, when Tatius attacked Rome, he almost succeeded in capturing the city because of the treason of the Vestal Virgin Tarpeia, daughter of Spurius Tarpeius, governor of the citadel on the Capitoline Hill. She opened the city gates for the Sabines in return for "what they bore on their arms". She believed that she would receive their golden bracelets. Instead, the Sabines crushed her to death and threw her from the rock, later named for her.

The towering walls in the background of the painting have been interpreted as an allusion to the Bastille, whose storming on 14 July 1789 marked the beginning of the French Revolution.

== Production ==
David began planning the work while he was imprisoned in the Luxembourg Palace from 29 May to 3 August 1795. France was at war with other European nations after a period of civil conflict culminating in the Reign of Terror and the Thermidorian Reaction, during which David had been imprisoned as a supporter of Robespierre. David hesitated between representing either this subject or that of Homer reciting his verses to his fellow Greeks. He finally chose to make a canvas representing the Sabine women interposing themselves to separate the Romans and Sabines, as a "sequel" to Poussin's The Rape of the Sabine Women. According to a popular account, he was inspired to paint it in honour of his estranged wife, Charlotte, after she visited him there.

He began preparations shortly after his release, in the autumn of 1795, assisted in his research by his student Pierre-Maximilien Delafontaine. From February 1796, he worked in a temporary studio in the Louvre, and later moved to premises on the Champs-Élysées.

The female models for The Intervention of the Sabine Women were aristocratic women, whose appearances David blended with those of Classical sculptures. Numerous apocryphal anecdotes arose in Paris about the involvement of Adèle de Bellegarde and her sister Aurore, who modelled for the two central Sabine women. Aurore de Bellegarde became David's model for Hersilia, while Adèle modelled for the crouching figure seen to her right. Sources disagree as to how the arrangement began: in the version reported by Miette de Villars in 1850, the sisters and Thérésa Tallien, by then a leading figure in Parisian high society, heard that David had been struggling to find female models and visited his studio in the nude, offering to model for Hersilia. David is said to have exclaimed "Mesdames, me voilà comme Pâris devant les trois grâces!" ("Mesdames, here I am like Paris in front of the three Graces!"). In a second version reported by David's student Étienne-Jean Delécluze in 1855, the de Bellegardes were brought to the studio by Madame de Noailles, (Note: Her identity is unknown, as Delécluze does not specify her first name: Daudet claims that there were three women with that surname in Paris at the time, but to have been unable to ascertain which Delécluze intended.) a friend of David's, and caught the painter's attention with their long and beautiful hairstyles. Certainly, both de Bellegarde sisters were well known among the Parisian art world, and for their acquaintance with artists of various genres.

In de Villars' version, David was most taken by Aurore, who sat for Hersilia, only asking Adèle and Tallien to pose "out of politeness". According to Delécluze, however, it was Adèle's long, dark hair that most interested him: at the time, he had already painted the crouching figure next to Hersilia (which had been completed by October 1796), and expressed regret that he had not had de Bellegarde's face as a model from which to do so. De Bellegarde accordingly allowed him to repaint the figure's face and hair after her own, while he used part of Aurore's leg in his figure of Hersitia. David's use of the de Bellegarde sisters as models has been interpreted as creating a link between the mythological Sabine Women and Parisian women of his own time, which has itself been interpreted as "affording a familial basis for the reconciliation of a divided and warring post-Revolutionary France".

According to Delécluze, the attention David paid to the painting of Adèle de Bellegarde's face led to rumours of an affair between her and the painter, which Delécluze considered baseless. Other rumours circulated as to whether she had posed fully nude.

The Intervention of the Sabine Women was first exhibited at the Louvre on December 21, 1799, a few weeks after the Coup of 18 Brumaire, in what has been described as "the major artistic event of the late 1790s in Paris." The diaphanous gowns worn by its female characters were credited for starting a fashion for similar outfits, known as dresses à la antique ("Ancient-style"), among Parisian high society. In a private display of the painting the artist charged a fee for admission to see the work, and used a large mirror in his installation so that spectators could view themselves within the reflection of the painting.

== Influence ==
The genesis of Les Sabines and the work itself represented a significant departure for the day. Historical depictions had been typically commissioned. David however, conceived, produced and promoted his work for profit. (Note: Halliday 2006, p.199 n.1, 1, quoting Dorothy Johnson: In Search of a Beholder: On the Relation between Art, Audiences, and Social Spheres in Post-Thermidor France, Art Bulletin, vol. 74, 1992, pp. 19–36) He produced marketing material to accompany the first exhibition. Le Tableau des Sabines, Exposé Publiquement au Palais National des Sciences et des Arts ("the Tableau of the Sabines, Public Exhibition at the National Palace of Arts and Science") contained his own account of the historic episode and had an endnote explaining his rationale for using nudity in the painting. Its 1799 exhibition attracted 50,000 paying visitors and generated 66,000 francs in revenue.

First Consul, Napoleon Bonaparte, however, disapproved of the endeavor. He declared that only works exhibited at the (exhibition) Salon would qualify for public funding, rejecting the state's purchase of the painting. It was ultimately King of France Louis XVIII who acquired in 1819 the piece (alongside Leonidas at Thermopylae, finished in 1814) for a combined total of 100,000 francs (approximately €210,000 of 2025).

Starting in 1977, France issued a series of stamps featuring the head of Hersilia based on David's painting.

After the expulsion of artists including David from the Louvre, the painting was held in the ancient church of the Collège de Cluny, which he used as a workshop. That building is now operated as the Musée de Cluny.

== See also ==
- List of paintings by Jacques-Louis David

== Bibliography ==
- Bordes, Phillipe (2022). Jacques-Louis David: Radical Draftsman. New Haven: Yale University Press. ISBN 9781588397461.
- Bordes, Phillipe (2005). Jacques-Louis David: Empire to Exile. New Haven: Yale University Press. ISBN 9780300104479.
- Daudet, Ernest (1903). "Les Dames de Bellegarde: Mœurs des temps de la Révolution: I: Autour du Château des Marches" . Revue des Deux Mondes (journal). 5 (in French). 17: 570–603 – via Wikisource.
- David, Jacques-Louis (1800), Le tableau des Sabines, exposé publiquement au Palais national des sciences et des arts (in French), Paris: Pierre Didot
- de Villars, Miette (1850). Mémoires de David: Peintre et Député à La Convention (in French). Paris.
- Delécluze, Étienne-Jean (1855). Louis David: Son École et Son Temps (in French). Paris: Bonaventure and Ducessois.
- Gibbons, Stanley (2012). Stamps of the World. Stanley Gibbons. ISBN 9780852598382.
- Gover, Louise Juliet (1999). 'Invisibles et presentes par-tout': Re-viewing Women from the Ancient Past in Late Eighteenth-Century French Art (PDF) (Ph.D.). University College London. Archived from the original (PDF) on 2023-02-12.
- Grimaldo Grigsby, Darcy (1998). "Nudity à la grecque in 1799". The Art Bulletin. 80 (2): 311–335. JSTOR 3051235.
- Gueniffey, Patrice (2015). Bonaparte. Harvard University Press. ISBN 9780674368354.
- Halliday, Tony (2006). "The Trouble with Tatius". Oxford Art Journal. 29 (2): 197–211. doi:10.1093/oxartj/kcl002. JSTOR 3841012.
- Johnson, Dorothy (2006). "David and Napoleonic Painting". In Johnson, Dorothy (ed.). Jacques-Louis David: New Perspectives. Newark: University of Delaware Press. pp. 131–143. ISBN 9780874139303.
- Kraus, Heidi (2010). David, architecture, and the dichotomy of art (Ph.D). University of Iowa.
- Lajer-Burcharth, Ewa (1999). Necklines: The Art of Jacques-Louis David After the Terror. New Haven: Yale University Press. ISBN 9780300074215.
- Muther, Richard (1895). The History of Modern Painting. Vol. 1. London: Henry and Co.
- Roberts, Warren (1992). Jacques-Louis David, Revolutionary Artist: Art, Politics, and the French Revolution. Chapel Hill: The University of North Carolina Press. ISBN 0807843504.
