= Psyche Abandoned (painting) =

Painting by Jacques-Louis David

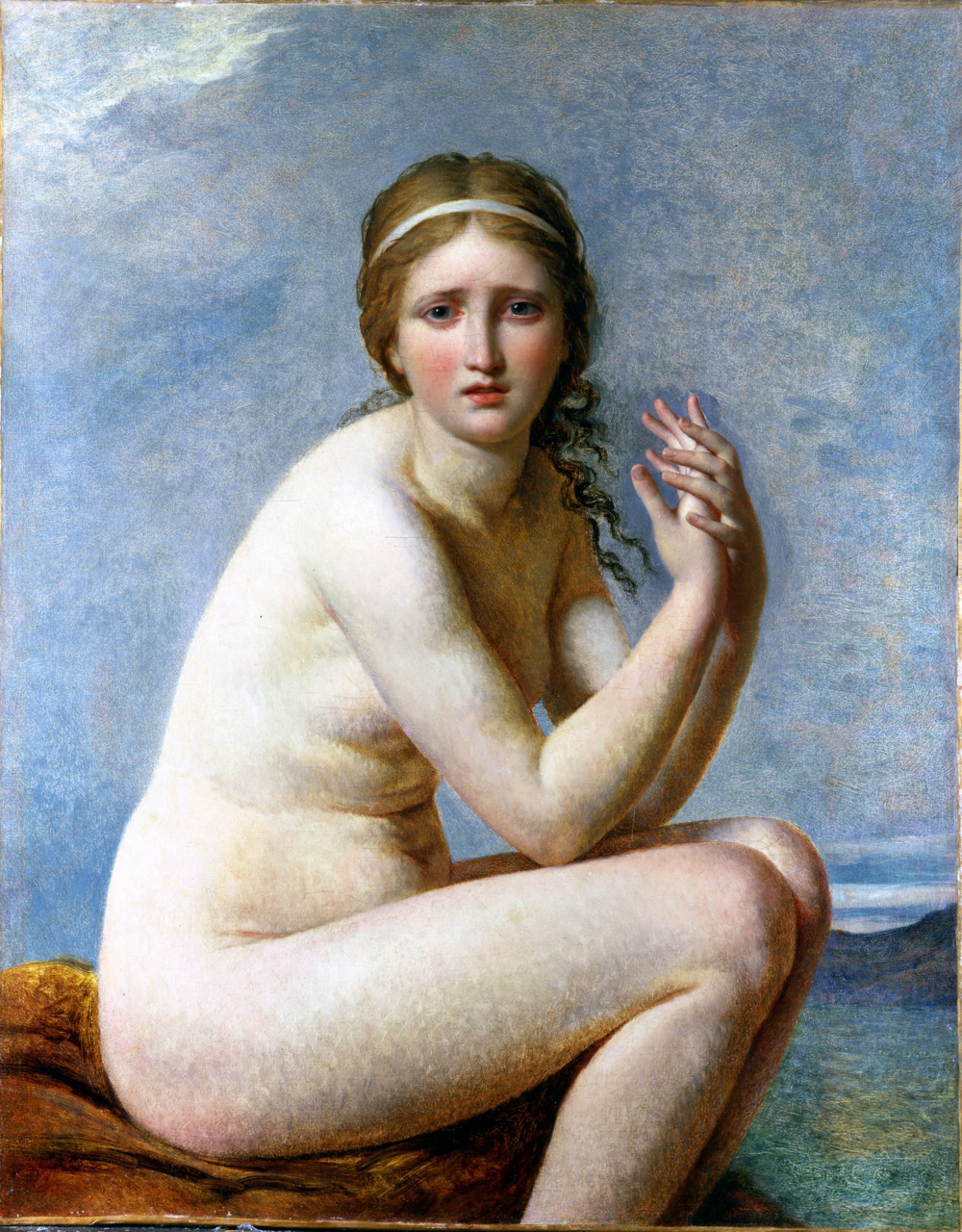
- Artist: Jacques-Louis David
- Year: 1795
- Medium: Oil on canvas
- Location: private collection

Psyche Abandoned is a c. 1795 painting by Jacques-Louis David, now in a private collection. It shows Psyche as a crouching female nude in profile against a blue sky with a hill in the background. She stares at the viewer with an expression of loss, pain, and betrayal. Thought to have been painted during David's imprisonment during the French Revolution, it dates from either 1794 or 1795. Vertical in format, it diverges from the academic conventions for representing the female nude.

The work was long known only through notations in David's lists of his own paintings, where it was described as a "painted study of Psyche" and as a pendant to The Vestal Virgin. Long thought lost, it was rediscovered in 1991 and exhibited in the 2010 Louvre exhibition L’Antiquité rêvée.

== Painting ==
=== Origins ===
Psyche Abandoned is widely described as having been painted following David’s arrest in 1794. After the death of Robespierre, David was imprisoned along with fellow Jacobins. Like other paintings done during his imprisonment, Psyche Abandoned is thought to be unfinished. Psyche Abandoned is less well known than David's other works painted during this time: Self-portrait and The Intervention of the Sabine Women. David is thought to have painted Psyche Abandoned while imprisoned at the Hôtel du Luxembourg. He was transferred from the Hôtel des Fermes in September of 1794. This transfer meant there was no opportunity for an early release from prison and David was also isolated from the outside world (visits from friends, family, and students had previously been allowed at the Hôtel des Fermes). The transfer to isolation was described as “abandonment” by David in a letter to a former prison mate. Psyche Abandoned was intended to be David’s return to the Salon following his release from prison in 1795. Instead, he chose to present Emilie Sériziat, Pierre Sériziat, and View of the Luxembourg Gardens.

=== Other depictions of Psyche ===
The myth of Psyche was popularized in France in the 1600s by La Fontaine’s version of the story. Psyche, a mortal, had to persevere through hardships and trials in order to be granted immortality. She was forbidden to look directly at Cupid, her lover. Upon doing so, Cupid abandons her, taking with him her palace, belongings, and attendants. She is left naked and distraught.

Pajou's marble sculpture Psyche Abandoned is considered an important precedent for David's painting. It is thought that David took inspiration from Pajou while expressing his own suffering through Psyche. Jean-Honore Fragonard also painted a popular piece showing the abandonment of Psyche by Cupid. These works all focus on the emotional distress of Psyche. She has been abandoned by Cupid, her lover, and sits nude and powerless. The mythological figure’s emotional state is showcased in each of these paintings.

== Analysis ==
=== Connection to David's life ===
==== Abandonment ====
Scholars have compared Psyche’s distraught expression to David’s own feelings of abandonment. It is thought that David experienced significant mental distress as a result of his arrest and his declining public reputation. David expressed these feelings of abandonment in a letter to his former prison mate M. de Mainbourg.

==== Femininity ====
Scholars have observed a lack of sexuality in the depiction of Psyche. Psyche’s expression and pose conveys more desperation than loss, her body crouched over, her arms covering her chest, with no indication of sensuality except for her missing clothing. The art historian Ewa Lajer-Burcharth has suggested that Psyche's sexual indeterminacy relates to David’s own crisis of identity during his imprisonment, when his sense of masculine stoicism began to erode.

=== Comparison to other works ===
==== Away from the Neoclassical ====
A 2011 exhibition at the Museum of Fine Arts of Houston contrasted the painting with David’s better known The Oath of the Horatii. Psyche Abandoned was presented as David's turn away from Neoclassicism, showcasing intense, individual emotion instead of heroic acts of virtue and morality.

==== Loss and grief ====
Psyche Abandoned builds upon David’s previous explorations grief. The figure of Andromache in Andromache’s Grief has sometimes been described as a precedent for the depiction of Psyche. Crito’s pose in The Death of Socrates may also have served as a reference.

== See also ==
- List of paintings by Jacques-Louis David

== Bibliography ==
- Verbraeken, René (1973). Jacques-Louis David jugé par ses contemporains et par la postérité. Suivi de la liste des tableaux dont l'authenticité est garantie par les écrits de l'artiste, des documents de son époque, ou par leur appartenance à ses descendants (in French). Paris: Léonce Laget. ISBN 2-85204-001-8. OCLC 746363.
  - Furbank, P.N. (May 25, 2000). "Dreams of the Body". The New York Review of Books: 14–16. ProQuest 213680342.
  - Gully, Anthony Lacy; Lajer-Burcharth, Ewa (October 2001). "Necklines: The Art of Jacques-Louis David after the Terror". The American Historical Review. 106 (4): 1469–1470. doi:10.2307/2693119. JSTOR 2693119.
  - Lebensztein, Jean-Claude (2011). "Necklines: The Art of Jacques-Louis David After the Terror". The Art Bulletin. 83 (1): 153–157. doi:10.2307/3177197. JSTOR 3177197. ProQuest 222965790.
  - Padiyar, Satish (2011). "Neo-classicisms: Paris and Houston". The Burlington Magazine. 153 (1298): 357–358. JSTOR 23055893.
  - Schroder, Anne L. (June 2011). "Fragonard's Later Career: The Contes et Nouvelles and the Progress of Love Revisited". The Art Bulletin. 93 (2): 150–177. doi:10.1080/00043079.2011.10786002. S2CID 152088420.
  - Lajer-Burcharth, Ewa. Necklines: The Art of Jacques-Louis David after the Terror. New Haven: Yale University Press, 1999. Accessed November 21, 2022. https://www.aaeportal.com/?id=-22998.
