= Cucharmoy =

Commune in Seine-et-Marne, France

- Part of Chenoise-Cucharmoy
- Coat of arms
- Location of Cucharmoy
- Location within France Location within Île-de-France (region)
- Coordinates: 48°35′00″N 3°11′40″E
- Country: France
- Region: Île-de-France
- Department: Seine-et-Marne
- Arrondissement: Provins
- Canton: Provins
- Commune: Chenoise-Cucharmoy
- Area^{1}: 12.83 km^{2} (4.95 sq mi)
- Highest elevation: 164 m (538 ft)
- Lowest elevation: 126 m (413 ft)
- Population (2016): 225
  - Density: 17.5/km^{2} (45.4/sq mi)
- Time zone: UTC+01:00 (CET)
  - Summer (DST): UTC+02:00 (CEST)
- Postal code: 77160
- ^{1} French Land Register data, which excludes lakes, ponds, glaciers > 1 km^{2} (0.386 sq mi or 247 acres) and river estuaries.

Cucharmoy (French pronunciation: [kyʃaʁmwa]) is a former commune in the Seine-et-Marne department in the Île-de-France region in north-central France. On 1 January 2019, it was merged into the new commune Chenoise-Cucharmoy.

== See also ==
- Communes of the Seine-et-Marne department
