= Étienne Lamy =

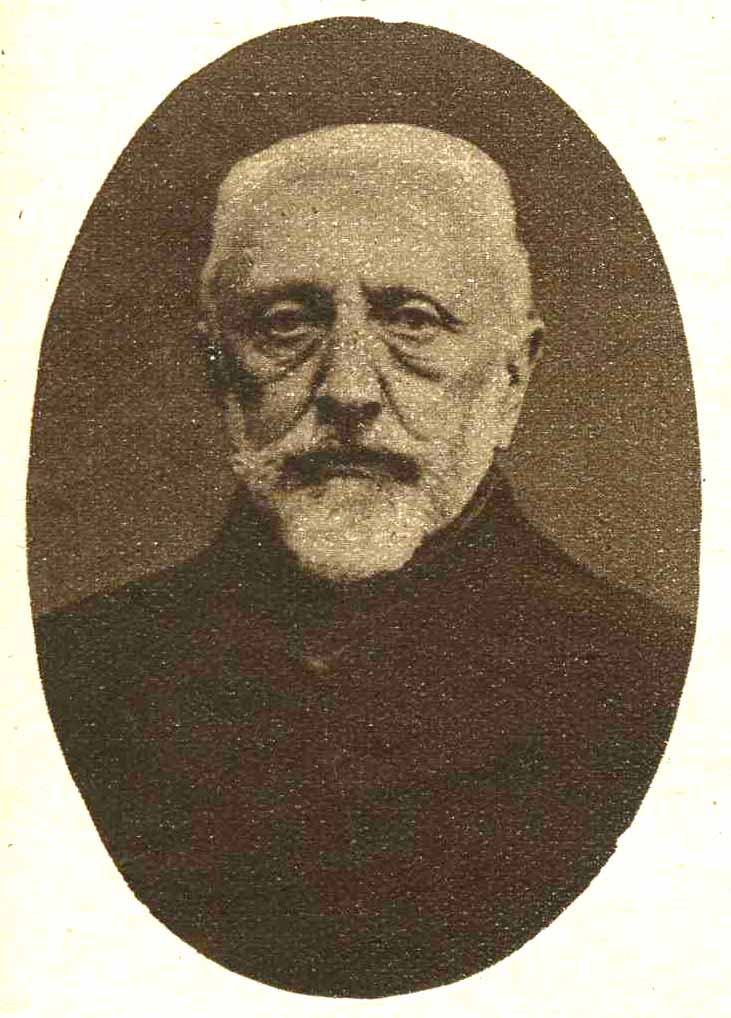
Étienne Lamy.

Étienne Marie Victor Lamy (French pronunciation: [etjɛn lami]; 2 June 1845, in Cize, Jura – 9 January 1919) was a French author.

He was educated at the College Stanislas and became a doctor of law in 1870. From 1871 to 1881, he was a deputy from his native department, Jura, and his earlier writings were political and historical. In the House of Deputies he was a member of the Left, but he broke with his party and became a clerical reactionary, writing for the Gaulois and the Correspondant. In 1905, he became a member of the Académie française (seat #21), and in 1913 he succeeded Thureau-Dangin as its perpetual secretary. Among Lamy's works are:

- Le tiers parti (1868)
- L'Armée et la democratie (1889)
- La France du Levant (1898)
- Etudes sur le second empire (1895)
- La femme de demain (1899)
- an edition of the memoirs of Aimée de Coigny (1900)
- Témoins de jours passés (1909, 1913)
- Au service des idées et des lettres (1909)
- Quelques œuvres et quelques œuvriers (1910, 1913)
