= Chenoise-Cucharmoy =

- Commune
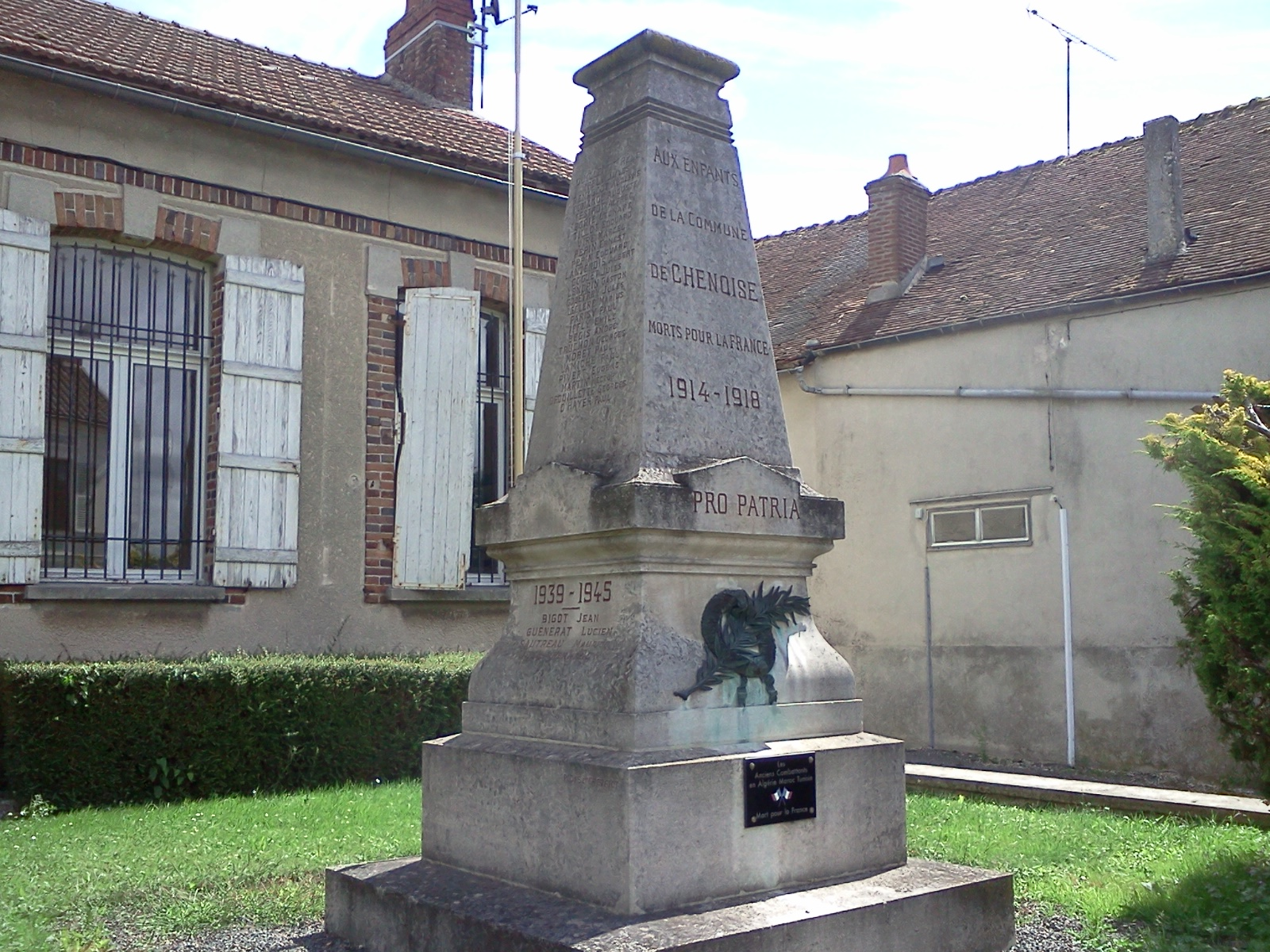
- The war memorial in Chenoise
- Location of Chenoise-Cucharmoy
- Location within France Location within Île-de-France (region)
- Coordinates: 48°36′57″N 3°11′44″E
- Country: France
- Region: Île-de-France
- Department: Seine-et-Marne
- Arrondissement: Provins
- Canton: Provins
- Intercommunality: CC Provinois

Government
  - Mayor (2020–2026): Alain Bontour
- Area^{1}: 48.68 km^{2} (18.80 sq mi)
- Highest elevation: 169 m (554 ft)
- Lowest elevation: 119 m (390 ft)
- Population (2023): 1,607
  - Density: 33.01/km^{2} (85.50/sq mi)
- Time zone: UTC+01:00 (CET)
  - Summer (DST): UTC+02:00 (CEST)
- INSEE/Postal code: 77109 /77160
- ^{1} French Land Register data, which excludes lakes, ponds, glaciers > 1 km^{2} (0.386 sq mi or 247 acres) and river estuaries.

Chenoise-Cucharmoy (French pronunciation: [ʃənwaz kyʃaʁmwa]) is a commune in the Seine-et-Marne department in the Île-de-France région in north-central France. It was established on 1 January 2019 by merger of the former communes of Chenoise (the seat) and Cucharmoy.

== See also ==
- Communes of the Seine-et-Marne department
