= George Kriehn =

American writer and lecturer on art

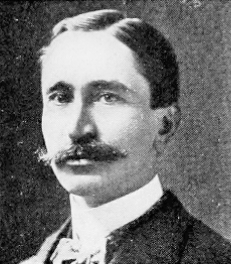
- Born: April 19, 1868; Lexington, Missouri
- Died: September 17, 1944 (aged 76)
- Education: William Jewell College; University of Strasbourg
- Occupation: Writer
- Spouses: Luise Morell (m. 1890) Evelyn Van Norman (m. 1912)

George H. Kriehn, Ph.D. (April 19, 1868 – September 17, 1944) was an American writer and lecturer on art.

== Biography ==
George Kriehn was born as third of five children in Lexington, Missouri. His father August Georges Krien had married Amelia Meyer and he was dry goods merchant. George graduated in 1887 from William Jewell College. He traveled and studied in various cities in Europe. He received his Ph.D. from the University of Strasbourg.

During his studies in Zurich he met Luise Morell; they married on March 30, 1890. He left his wife and their child, Marie-Luise, and returned to the United States. He remained in contact with his wife at least until 1908. In 1912, he married a second time, to Evelyn Van Norman, from Canada. There is no evidence that he got divorced from his first wife.

He was employed at Johns Hopkins (1892–94) and at Stanford (1894–98). He resided in New York after 1901. In 1907, he became staff lecturer at the Woman's Art School of Cooper Union. Columbia appointed him extension lecturer on art in 1912. He wrote: The English Rising in 1450 (1892). He edited and translated Muther's History of Painting (two volumes, 1909) and revised Fergusson's History of Architecture (two volumes, 1910).
