= Chenoise =

Commune in Seine-et-Marne, France

- Part of Chenoise-Cucharmoy
- Location of Chenoise
- Location within France Location within Île-de-France (region)
- Coordinates: 48°36′57″N 3°11′44″E
- Country: France
- Region: Île-de-France
- Department: Seine-et-Marne
- Arrondissement: Provins
- Canton: Provins
- Commune: Chenoise-Cucharmoy
- Area^{1}: 35.85 km^{2} (13.84 sq mi)
- Highest elevation: 169 m (554 ft)
- Lowest elevation: 119 m (390 ft)
- Population (2016): 1,386
  - Density: 38.66/km^{2} (100.1/sq mi)
- Time zone: UTC+01:00 (CET)
  - Summer (DST): UTC+02:00 (CEST)
- Postal code: 77160
- ^{1} French Land Register data, which excludes lakes, ponds, glaciers > 1 km^{2} (0.386 sq mi or 247 acres) and river estuaries.

Chenoise (French pronunciation: [ʃənwaz]) is a former commune in the Seine-et-Marne department in the Île-de-France région in north-central France. On 1 January 2019, it was merged into the new commune Chenoise-Cucharmoy. The inhabitants are called Chenoisiens.

The Château de Chenoise was the seat of the aristocratic Le Cat d'Hervilly family. After Louis Charles d'Hervilly fled France as an émigré, the château was confiscated and sold in 1793, but it was purchased by Adèle de Bellegarde and her sister Aurore, daughters of Louis Charles' sister Marie Charlotte Adélaïde Le Cat d'Hervilly.

== See also ==
- Communes of the Seine-et-Marne department
