= Grégoire Jagot =

19th-century French politician

- Grégoire Marie Jagot

French National Legislative Assembly 1791-1792
- Deputy of Ain
- In office 1791–1792
- Monarch: Louis XVI

French National Legislative Assembly 1792 Deputy of Ain
- In office 1792–1795

Monaco Governor
- In office 1792–1795

Grégoire Marie Jagot (pronounced [ɡʁeɡwaʁ ʒaɡo]; 21 May 1750, Nantua, France – 22 January 1838, Toul, France) was a French commissioner and justice of the peace in the times of French revolution.

== Life ==
Grégoire Marie Jagot was born on 21 May 1750 in Nantua. In the beginning of French revolution Jagot worked as a justice of the peace in Nantua. On 1 September 1791, he was elected as a deputy of Ain in the National Legislative Assembly where he served for one year. Then on 5 September 1792, Jagot was elected to National Convention. In September 1792, he was sent to Savoy to organize the Mont-Blanc department there, therefore Jagot was not present during the trial of Louis XVI and did not vote.

On 13 January 1793, Jagot along with his three colleagues wrote a letter where they stated that they are convinced of the crimes of Louis Capet and call for his condemnation without appeal to the people. The same day they wrote the second letter, clarifying the first collective letter. In the second letter, the representatives declared their clear preference for the death sentence for Louis XVI.

After France occupied Monaco in 1793, Jagot was one of those who governed Monaco. Along with Henri Baptist Grégoire, Jagot organized the new department of the Alpes-Maritimes after the annexation of the County of Nice by French Republic.

Jagot and Grégoire urged local people of Alpes-Maritimes department to attend patriotic festivities on the occasion of annexation in order to strengthen the communal spirit and public opinion of new citizens of the Republic.

Jagot became a member of the division committee and the general safety committee where he developed a police activity in consultation with Amar and Vadier. He is widely cited by those he employed to create lists of alleged prison conspirators. The role of Jagot is very important in the methodical organization which led hundreds of people to the scaffold.

Jagot was accused of having removed documents relating to terrorists from the department of Ain when he was a member of the general security committee. He was arrested, and remained in prison until October 26, 1795, benefited from the amnesty.

After being released, Jagot settled in Toul, where he died on 22 January 1838.
