= Casimir, Comte de Montrond =

French diplomatic agent

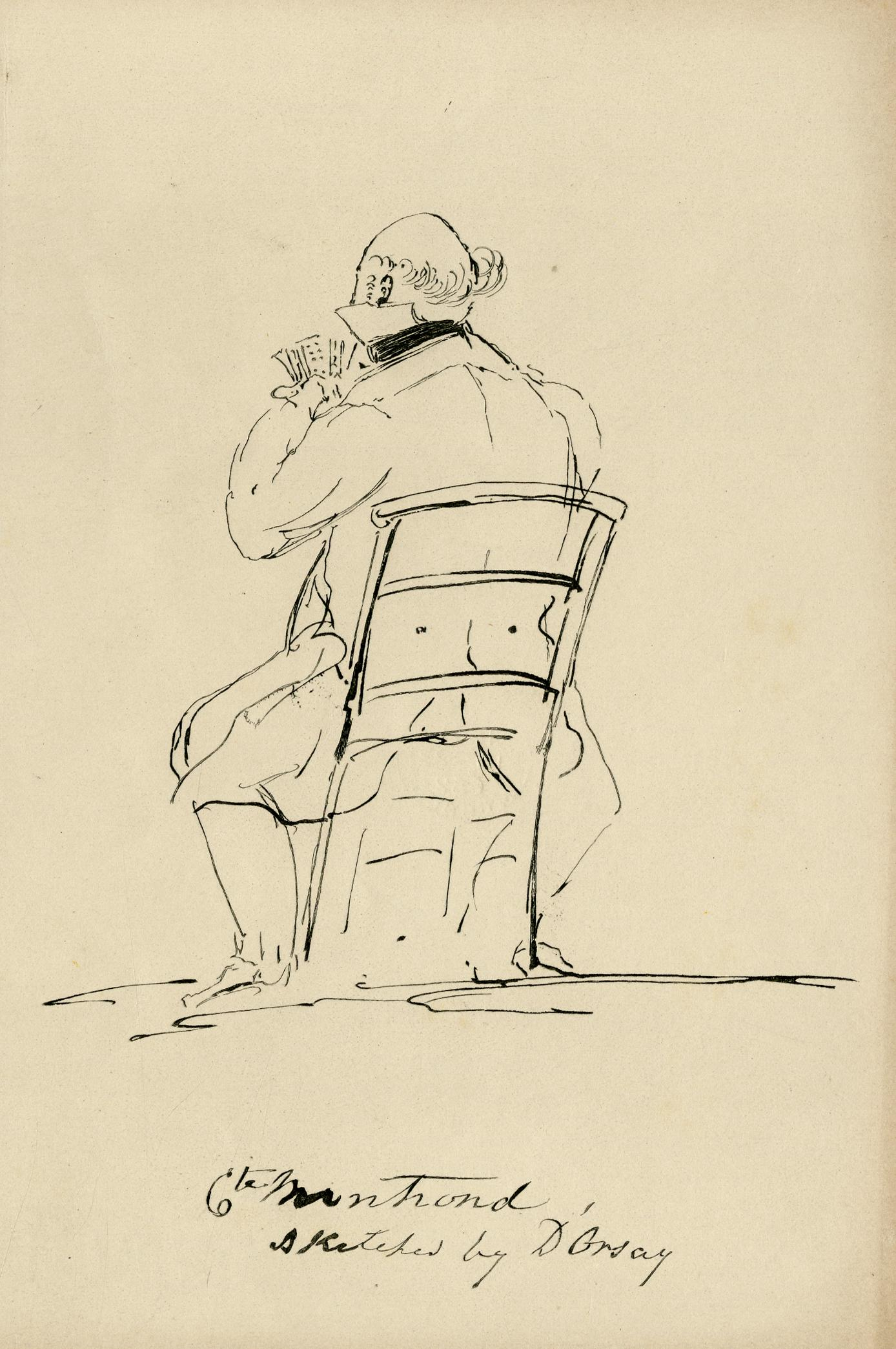
Portrait of Casimir, Comte de Montrond, seen from behind, sitting on a chair, holding cards, lithograph by Alfred d'Orsay

Casimir, Comte de Montrond (1768–1843) was a French diplomatic agent and the son of a military officer. His mother, Anglique Marie d'Arlus, comtesse de Montrond (died 1827), was a royalist writer, said to be the author of the Troubadour barnois, a song which has the refrain "Louis, le fils de Henri, Est prisonnier dans Paris". Casimir was imprisoned in 1794 in St. Lazare, where he met the salonniere Aimée de Coigny, known for her charm and beauty. He bought her freedom and his own with 100 louis. They married and crossed to London, but the union proved unhappy, and they were divorced on their return to Paris.

Turning to the fashionable world, Casimir de Montrond became famous for his successes. He was the confidant and political agent of Talleyrand, and his inside knowledge of politics enabled him to make a large fortune on the Bourse. In 1809 he was disgraced for some imprudent comments on the imperial system, and exiled from Paris. After spending some time at Antwerp he removed to Spa, where he was on intimate terms with Pauline Borghese, and in 1811 he returned to Antwerp; here he was arrested on Napoleon's orders and sent to the fortress of Ham. After a month's imprisonment, he received permission to reside, under police supervision, at Chátillon-sur-Seine, whence he presently escaped to England.

He returned to France at the first Bourbon restoration, and during the Hundred Days was entrusted with a mission to Vienna to convert Talleyrand to Napoleon's interests, to see Metternich and Nesselrode, and to bring back, if possible, Marie Louise and the King of Rome. The second restoration restored him to his social triumphs, though he was always under police supervision, and on Talleyrand's fall he accompanied him to Château de Valençay and continued to help with his intrigues. He followed Talleyrand to London in 1832. Montrond returned to Paris some time before his death in 1843.

According to Recollections and Anecdotes of Captain Rees Howell Gronow, Montrond originated the sayings falsely attributed to Talleyrand:

"La parole a été donnée à l’homme pour l’aider à cacher sa pensée." ["Speech was given to man to aid him at concealing his thoughts."]

"Défiez-vous des premiers mouvements; ils sont presque toujours bons." ["Mistrust first impulses; they are nearly always good."]
