= Aimée de Coigny =

French salonnière (1769–1820)

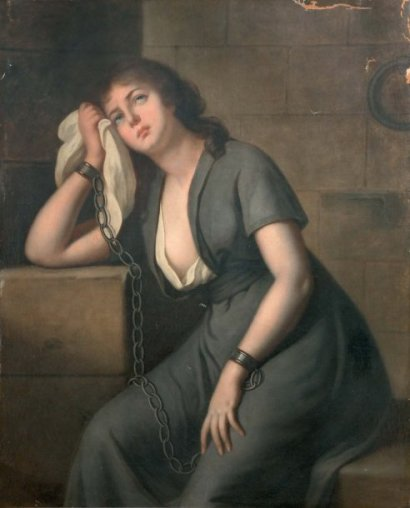
- La Jeune Captive
- Born: Anne-Françoise-Aimée de Franquetot de Coigny; 12 October 1769; Paris, France
- Died: 17 January 1820 (aged 50); Paris, France
- Occupation: Salonnière

Aimée de Coigny (12 October 1769 – 17 January 1820) was a French noblewoman who was known as a great beauty and was imprisoned during the French Revolution. André Chénier's elegy la Jeune Captive, published in 1795, was inspired by her ordeal.

== Early years ==
Aimée de Coigny was the daughter of Auguste-Gabriel de Franquetot, comte de Coigny. He was born in 1740, joined the army, became colonel of dragoons in 1763, maréchal-de-camp in 1780, and on 1 January 1811 gained the rank of lieutenant general. Her father married Anne Josèphe Michel de Roissy on 18 March 1767. Madame de Genlis was an intimate friend of Anne de Roissy, and wrote of her in her memoirs:

I saw again with great pleasure; at Isle-Adam, the young Comtesse de Coigny, formerly Mademoiselle de Roissy, with whom I had been close at the Couvent du Précieux-Sang. She had originality, wit and good feelings; we renewed our acquaintance; she told me that she had a passion for anatomy, a very extraordinary taste in a young woman of eighteen. Since I had been somewhat occupied with surgery and medicine, and knew how to bleed, Madame de Coigny was very fond of chatting with me. I promised to do an anatomy class, but not like her, on corpses ..."

Anne-Françoise-Aimée de Coigny was born on 12 October 1769 and baptised in the church of Saint-Roch. Her mother died on 23 October 1775, and her father confided her upbringing to his mistress, Victoire de Rohan, Princess of Guéménée.

Aimée became a famous beauty. She married André-Hercule-Marie-Louis de Rosset de Rocozel (1770–1810), marquis and later duc de Fleury in 1784. (Note: André Hercule Marie Louis de Rosset de Rocozels, duc de Fleury (1767–1810), was an officer in the French army, then in the Armée des Émigrés. In 1806 he was allowed to return to Paris, where he died.) Her husband was the grand-nephew of Cardinal André-Hercule de Fleury. She married very young, as was common at the time; she was 15, he was 14. He became a duke in 1788. He was subject to nervous tics that were very disagreeable, and the marriage was not happy. Aimee became the mistress of Armand Louis de Gontaut, duc de Lauzun (1747–1793), a well-known libertine, if past his prime. During a visit to Rome, she became attached to Lord Malmesbury.

== French revolution ==
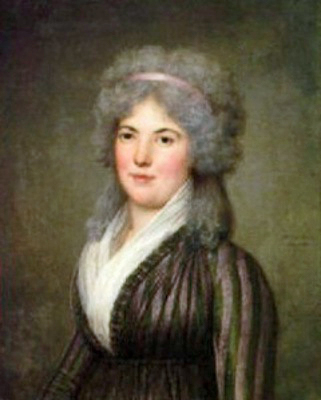
Aimée around 1797 by Adolf Ulrik Wertmüller

Aimée's husband Fleury emigrated during the French Revolution (1789–99), leaving France in 1791. He joined Louis Joseph, Prince of Condé's army at Koblenz. Aimée went to London, where she rejoined Malmesbury. She gave birth to Malmesbury's child in London. In January 1793 she left London for Paris with Lord Malmesbury. He was soon arrested, but was released almost immediately and returned to London, leaving his mistress. She retired to her personal estate at Mareuil-en-Brie, near Paris. On 7 May 1793 she obtained a divorce. She then resumed the name of Coigny.

On 4 March 1794, despite the care she had taken to dissociate herself from any emigrants, she was arrested and taken to the Prison Saint-Lazare. Aimée was one of the last of the nobility to be arrested and incarcerated. André Chénier was inspired by her to compose a well-known elegy, la Jeune Captive, published in 1795. (Note: It was not known who was the subject of Chenier's poem until years later, when the subject came up in the salon of Gabriel Delessert, wife of the chief of police. The comte de Montrond was there, and revealed that it was Aimee de Coigny. He knew because he had married her.) He described her graceful figure and her easy and careless character.

Casimir de Mouret, comte de Montrond, (Note: Claude Philibert de Mouret, Seigneur de Montrond, had three sons: Edouard, Casimir and Hippolyte, all born in Besançon. Some sources give the name of Aimée's second husband as Claude-Philibert-Hippolyte de Mouret, comte de Montrond. In fact it was Philippe-François-Casimir de Mouret, the second son, born in 1769.) was also imprisoned in 1794 in the Prison Saint-Lazare, where he met her. He obtained her freedom and his own for a payment of 100 louis. She was released on the day she was due to follow Chénier to the scaffold. They married after the Thermidorian Reaction of 27 July 1794 and left for England. Their married life in London was not successful.

== First Empire ==
The marriage went from bad to worse from 1800 onward. The divorce due to incompatibility was pronounced on 6 Germinal year X (28 March 1802). Aimée again became known as Madame Aimée de Coigny. At the age of 31, Aimée de Coigny, once more free, fell in love with the 37-year-old Jacques Joseph Garat (known as Maillia-Garat). He was a member of the Tribunát and was known as an orator, but was not known as a republican. They lived together for six years.

In a sympathetic sketch, Victor du Bled says Aimée's second divorce gave her a freedom that she used or misused considerably. She had an ardent and eccentric imagination that exposed her to a thousand dangers to which she hastened to succumb. When someone remarked that divorce makes adultery useless, she said, "We cannot marry them all, though." Élisabeth Vigée Le Brun said that Aimée had an enchanting face, a burning gaze, and the figure of a Venus. One evening at the house of M. de Guéménée, she removed the long tail of her dress in front of fifty people. The princess, laughing, invited her to remove the dress too, and she rose to the challenge and remained for four hours dressed in a short petticoat. Napoleon disliked her loose morals and at reception at the Tuileries Palace asked her in public, "Well, Madame, are you still so fond of men?" Her riposte was, "Yes, Sire, when they are polite."

Around 1812 the 43-year-old Aimée de Coigny formed a liaison with the 45-year-old marquis Bruno-Gabriel de Boisgelin, and under his influence became an ardent royalist. She believed that the monarchy must be restored, but it should be a progressive monarchy that would reconcile freedom and order. In the summer of 1812, she often visited Talleyrand's house, where she would find him in his library surrounded by writers or lovers of literature. She became a regular visitor to the houses of people who were dissatisfied with Napoleon's rule. During the last days of the Empire in 1814, Aimee wrote to her uncle, the duc de Coigny, in London and told her of the conditions for Talleyrand to give his support to the king. The king instructed the duc to accept the offer. Not long after, the Russian army entered Paris.

== Death ==
Aimée de Coigny died on 17 January 1820 at the age of 50. She had confided her memoirs to Talleyrand, Montrond's friend, and it was long thought that they had been lost. They were later found and published as Mémoires de Aimée de Coigny (1902) with a lengthy introduction by Étienne Lamy.

== Publications ==
Publications by Aimée de Coigny included:

- Aimée de Coigny (1818), Alvare, Paris: impr. de Firmin Didot, p. 533
- Armand-Louis de Gontaut Biron; Amélie de Boufflers; Aimée de Coigny (1928), Mémoires de Armand-Louis de Gontaut, duc de Lauzun, général Biron, suivis de lettres adressées à l'auteur par sa femme Amélie de Boufflers; Aimée de Coigny, duchesse de Fleury (la "jeune captive", d'André Chénier), et par la marquise de Coigny, preface and notes by Edmond Pilon, Paris, p. 356
- Aimée de Coigny (1933), Captives de l'amour, Paris: phototypies de A. Dantan : C. Gaillandre, p. 265
- Aimée de Coigny (1943), Mémoires secrets du beau Lauzun, Paris: Editions Colbert; (Coulommiers; Paris : Impr. de Brodard et Taupin), p. 312
- Aimée de Coigny (1981), Journal, Paris: Perrin, p. 276
- Aimée de Coigny (1902), Mémoires de Aimée de Coigny, introduction and notes by Etienne Lamy, Paris: Calmann-Lévy, p. 295

== Sources ==
- Aimée de Coigny (1769-1820) (in French), BnF: Bibliotheque nationale de France
- Arrigon, Louis-Jules (1921), La jeune captive; Aimée de Coigny, duchesse de Fleury, et la société de son temps (1769-1820) d'après des documents nouveaux et inédits (in French), Paris: A. Lemerre
- Bled, Victor du (1889), "Un Amour Platonique au XVIIIe Siecle: Madame de Coigny et Lauzon", Revue des deux mondes (in French), Revue des deux mondes
- Chisholm, Hugh, ed. (1911), "Montrond, Casimir, Comte de" , Encyclopædia Britannica, vol. 18 (11th ed.), Cambridge University Press, pp. 792–793
- Duff Cooper, Alfred, 1st Viscount Norwich (2015-11-06), Talleyrand, Wagram Press, ISBN 978-1-78625-723-9
- Falk, Avner (2015-08-01), Napoleon Against Himself: A Psychobiography, Pitchstone Publishing (US&CA), ISBN 978-1-939578-72-3
- Favre, Jean Hervé, "Anne Josèphe MICHEL de ROISSY", geneanet (in French)
- Lamy, Etienne (1902), "Introduction", Mémoires de Aimée de Coigny, Paris: Calmann-Lévy
- Lescure, Mathurin (1882), La société française pendant la révolution: L'amour sous la terreur (in French), E. Dentu
- "M. de Montrond", The Nation, vol. 60, J.H. Richards, 1895
- Melbourne, Viscountess Elizabeth Milbanke Lamb (1998), Byron's "Corbeau Blanc": The Life and Letters of Lady Melbourne, Texas A&M University Press, ISBN 978-0-89096-672-3
- Michaud, Joseph Fr.; Michaud, Louis Gabriel (1836), Biographie universelle, ancienne et moderne; ou, Histoire, par ordre alphabétique: de la vie publique et privée de tous les hommes qui se sont fait remarquer par leurs écrits, leurs actions, leurs talents, leurs vertus ou leurs crimes (in French), Michaud frères
- Sainte-Beuve, Charles Augustin (1862), Galerie de femmes célèbres: tirée des Causeries de lundi (in French), Garnier
- Sainte-Marie, Anselme de (1879), Histoire généalogique et chronologique de la Maison de France (in French), Firmin-Didot
- Savary, Anne-Jean-Marie-René (duc de Rovigo) (1828), Memoirs of the Duke of Rovigo, (M.Savary) (in French), H. Colburn
- Stewart, H. F.; Desjardins, Paul (2016-09-15), French Patriotism in the Nineteenth Century (1814–1833), Cambridge University Press, ISBN 978-1-316-62006-9
- Vermale, François (July–September 1947), "Les Dames de Bellegarde", Annales historiques de la Révolution française, 19e Année (107), Armand Colin: 218–256, JSTOR 41925440
- Vittorini, D. (Summer 1939), "Review:: La Restaurazione Francese del 1814 by Aimée de Coigny", Books Abroad, 13 (3), Board of Regents of the University of Oklahoma, doi:10.2307/40081232, JSTOR 40081232
- Waroquier de Combles, Comte de (1787), Tableau genealogique, historique, chronologique, heraldique et geographique de la noblesse, enrichi de gravures (etc.) (in French), Nyon l'aine
