= Antoine Eugène Genoud =

French theologian and politician (1792–1849)

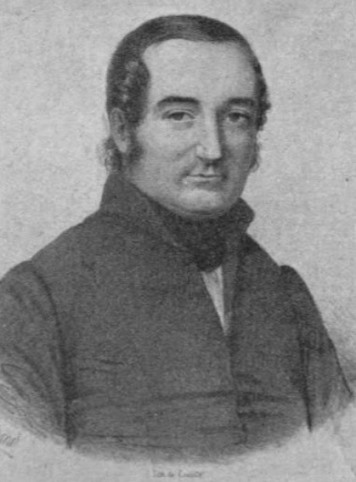
- Born: 9 February 1792; Montélimar, Drôme, Rhône-Alpes, France
- Died: 19 April 1849 (aged 57); Hyères, Var, Provence-Alpes-Côte d'Azur, France
- Occupation(s): Theologian, politician

Antoine Eugène Genoud (1792–1849) was a French theologian and politician.

== Early life ==
Antoine Eugène Genoud was born on 9 February 1792 in Montélimar, France. He was educated in Grenoble.

== Career ==
Genoud was a Roman Catholic theologian. He served as a member of the National Assembly from 1846 to 1848.

== Death ==
Genoud died on 19 April 1849 in Hyères, France.

== Bibliography ==
- Réflexions sur quelques questions politiques (1814).
- Voyage dans la Vendée et dans le midi de la France, suivi d'un Voyage pittoresque en Suisse (Paris: Nicolle, 1821).
- Considérations sur les Grecs et les Turcs (1821).
- La Raison du christianisme ou preuves de la religion, tirées des écrits des plus grands hommes (1834–1835).
- La Vie de Jésus-Christ et des Apôtres, tirée des saints Évangiles (1836).
- Leçons et modèles de littérature sacrée (with Jacques Honoré Lelarge de Lourdoueix, 1837).
- La Raison monarchique (1838).
- Exposition du dogme catholique (1840).
- Défense du christianisme par les Pères (1842).
- La divinité de Jésus-Christ annoncée par les prophètes (1842).
- Lettres sur l'Angleterre (1842).
- Histoire d'une âme (1844).
- Histoire de France (1844–1848).
- Sermons et conférences (1846).
