= Ewa Lajer-Burcharth =

Polish art historian

- Born: Warsaw, Poland
- Education: University of Warsaw; City University of New York
- Occupations: Art historian Professor

Ewa Lajer-Burcharth (born in Warsaw) is a Polish art historian and William Dorr Boardman Professor of Fine Arts in the History of Art and Architecture at Harvard University and Senior Adviser to the humanities program at the Radcliffe Institute. Her specialties include 18th-century French and contemporary art.

== Career ==
A native of Warsaw, Lajer-Burcharth received her Ph.D. from the Graduate Center at the City University of New York and her M.A. from the University of Warsaw in Poland. In 1999, Lajer-Burcharth published Necklines: The Art of Jacques-Louis David After the Terror. In 2000, she received a Guggenheim Fellowship for Fine Arts Research. In 2009-2010, she was a fellow at the Wissenschaftskolleg zu Berlin. In 2011, she published her second book Chardin Material.

== Works ==
- Necklines: The Art of Jacques-Louis David After the Terror (1999) ISBN 0300074212
- Chardin Material (2011) ISBN 1934105473
- The Painter's Touch: Boucher, Chardin, Fragonard (2018) ISBN 9780691170121
