= Richard Muther (art historian) =

German critic and historian of art (1860–1909)

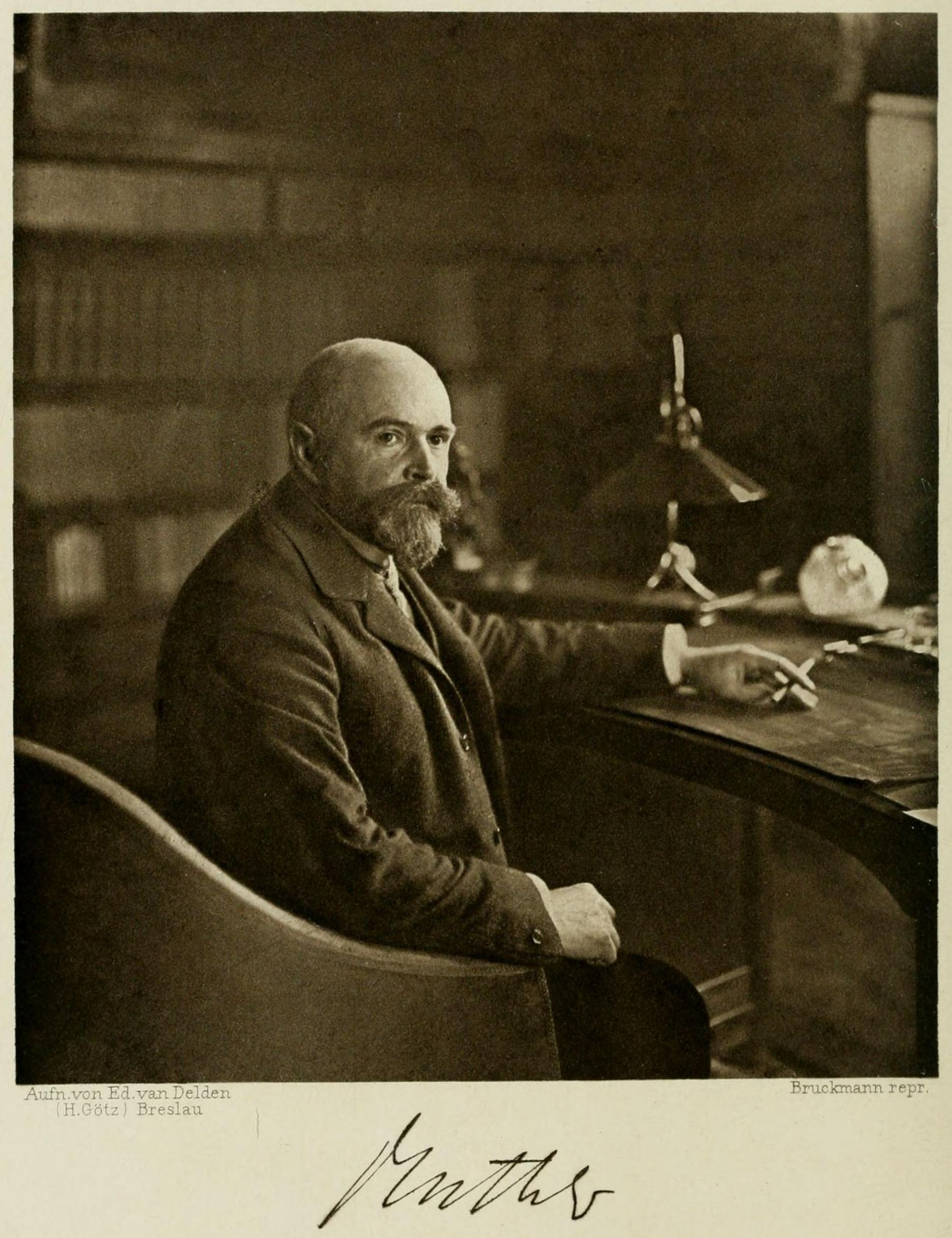
Richard Muther

Richard Muther (1860–1909) was a German critic and historian of art.

He was born 25 February 1860 in Ohrdruf in Germany and died 28 June 1909 in Wölfelsgrund (now in Poland). He studied at Heidelberg and at Leipzig, where he took his doctor's degree. In 1895 he became professor of art history at the University of Breslau.

He was one of the more prominent German art historians of his time, although he has been described as more popular with the general public than with the art fraternity of his day. The Russian artist Alexandre Benois wrote of Muther's appeal by saying that his ideas, "became common property and permeated the society so much that even the most conservative people started using 'Muther's parlance'".

He wrote Geschichte der Malerei (five volumes, 1899–1900); which appeared in English as The history of painting from the fourth to the early nineteenth century (2 volumes, 1907), translated and edited by George Kriehn. In 1907 The history of modern painting (4 volumes) was published in English.

He was also the author of books on Leonardo da Vinci (1900), Lucas Cranach (1903), Rembrandt (1904), Francisco Goya (1904), Diego Velázquez (1907), Jean-François Millet (1907) and Gustave Courbet (1908). His Die deutsche Bücherillustration der Gothik und Frührenaissance was later translated into English and published as German book illustration of the Gothic period and the early Renaissance (1460–1530) (1972).
