= The Rape of the Sabine Women (disambiguation) =

The rape of the Sabine women was an incident in Roman mythology.

The Rape of the Sabine Women may also refer to:

== Artworks ==
- Abduction of a Sabine Woman or The Rape of the Sabine, a sculpture by Giambologna
- Rape of the Sabines (Pietro da Cortona), two paintings by Pietro da Cortona
- The Rape of the Sabine Women (Poussin), two paintings by Nicolas Poussin
- The Rape of the Sabine Women (Rubens), a painting by Peter Paul Rubens

== Films ==
- The Rape of the Sabine Women (1962 film), a historical drama film
- The Rape of the Sabine Women (2006 film), an art film by Eve Sussman

== See also ==
- The Abduction of the Sabine Women (disambiguation)
- The Intervention of the Sabine Women (Vincent), a 1781 painting by François-André Vincent
- The Intervention of the Sabine Women, a 1799 painting by Jacques-Louis David
