= Tarpeia (disambiguation) =

Tarpeia was a Vestal Virgin, daughter of Spurius Tarpeius, who betrayed Ancient Rome to the Sabines

Tarpeia may also refer to:

- Tarpeian Rock (rupes Tarpeia), a cliff on Capitoline Hill in Rome
- Tarpeia gens, an ancient Roman family
- Tarpeia (crater), a crater on 4 Vesta
- Oeneis tarpeia (O. tarpeia), a species of butterfly
- SS Tarpeia (1905), a ship sunk in WWI, see List of shipwrecks in May 1917
