= Rape of the Sabine women =

Incident in Roman mythology

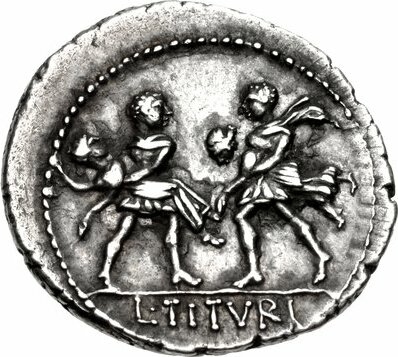
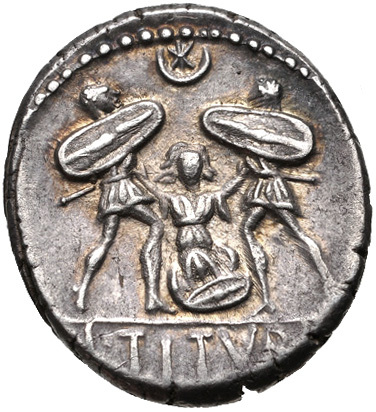
Two Roman Republican denarii, minted by Lucius Titurius Sabinus in 89 BC. The Sabine king Titus Tatius is portrayed on both obverses. The reverses depict the abduction of the Sabine women by Roman soldiers (left) and the punishment of Tarpeia by the Sabines (right).

The kidnapping of the Sabine women (Latin: Sabinae raptae, Classical pronunciation: [saˈbiːnae̯ ˈraptae̯]); traditionally known as the Rape of the Sabine women and also known as the abduction of the Sabine women, was an incident in the early history of Rome in which the men of Rome committed bride kidnappings or mass abduction for the purpose of marriage, of women from other cities in the region. It has been a frequent subject of painters and sculptors, particularly since the Renaissance.

== Story ==
=== Abduction of the Sabine women ===
According to Roman historian Livy, the abduction of Sabine women occurred in the early history of Rome shortly after its founding in the mid-8th century BC and was perpetrated by Romulus and his predominantly male followers; it is said that after the foundation of the city, the population consisted solely of Latins and other Italic peoples, in particular male bandits. With Rome growing at such a steady rate in comparison to its neighbors, Romulus became concerned with maintaining the city's strength. His main concern was that with few female inhabitants there would be no chance of sustaining the city's population, without which Rome might not last longer than a generation. On the advice of the Roman Senate, the Romans then set out into the surrounding regions in search of wives with whom they could establish families. The Romans negotiated unsuccessfully with all the peoples that they appealed to, including the Sabines, who populated the neighboring areas. The Sabines feared the emergence of a rival society and refused to allow their women to marry the Romans.

Consequently, the Romans devised a plan to abduct the Sabine women during the festival of Neptune Equester. They planned and announced a festival of games to attract people from all the nearby towns. According to Livy, many people from Rome's neighboring towns – including Caenina, Crustumerium, and Antemnae – attended the festival along with the Sabines, eager to see the newly established city for themselves. At the festival, Romulus gave a signal by "rising and folding his cloak and then throwing it round him again," at which the Romans grabbed the Sabine women and fought off the Sabine men. Livy does not report how many women were abducted by the Romans at the festival, he only notes that it was undoubtedly many more than thirty. All of the women abducted at the festival were said to have been virgins except for one married woman, Hersilia, who became Romulus's wife and would later be the one to intervene and stop the ensuing war between the Romans and the Sabines. The indignant abductees were soon implored by Romulus to accept the Roman men as their new husbands.

=== War with the Sabines and other tribes ===
Outraged at what had happened, the king of the Caeninenses entered upon Roman territory with his army. Romulus and the Romans met the Caeninenses in battle, killed their king, and routed their army. Romulus later attacked Caenina and took it upon the first assault. Returning to Rome, he dedicated a Temple of Jupiter Feretrius (according to Livy, the first temple dedicated in Rome) and offered the spoils of the enemy king as spolia opima. According to the Fasti Triumphales, Romulus celebrated a triumph over the Caeninenses on 1 March 752 BC.

At the same time, the army of the Antemnates invaded Roman territory. The Romans retaliated, and the Antemnates were defeated in battle and their town captured. According to the Fasti Triumphales, Romulus celebrated a second triumph in 752 BC over the Antemnates.

The Crustumini also started a war, but they too were defeated and their town was captured.

Roman colonists were subsequently sent to Antemnae and Crustumerium by Romulus, and many citizens of those towns, particularly the families of the captured women, also migrated to Rome.

The Sabines themselves finally declared war, led into battle by their king, Titus Tatius. Tatius almost succeeded in capturing Rome, thanks to the treason of Tarpeia, daughter of Spurius Tarpeius, Roman governor of the citadel on the Capitoline Hill. She opened the city gates for the Sabines in return for "what they bore on their arms", thinking she would receive their golden bracelets. Instead, the Sabines crushed her to death with their shields, and her body was buried on or thrown from a rock known ever since by her name, the Tarpeian Rock.

The Romans attacked the Sabines who now held the citadel, in what would become known as the Battle of the Lacus Curtius. The Roman advance was led by Hostus Hostilius, the Sabine defence by Mettus Curtius. Hostus fell in battle, and the Roman line gave way. The Romans retreated to the gate of the Palatium. Romulus rallied his men, promising to build a temple to the Roman God Jove on the site. He then led them back into battle. Mettus Curtius was unhorsed and fled on foot, and the Romans appeared to be winning.

At this point in the story, the Sabine women intervened:

[They], from the outrage on whom the war originated, with hair dishevelled and garments rent, the timidity of their sex being overcome by such dreadful scenes, had the courage to throw themselves amid the flying weapons, and making a rush across, to part the incensed armies, and assuage their fury; imploring their fathers on the one side, their husbands on the other, "that as fathers-in-law and sons-in-law they would not contaminate each other with impious blood, nor stain their offspring with parricide, the one their grandchildren, the other their children. If you are dissatisfied with the affinity between you, if with our marriages, turn your resentment against us; we are the cause of war, we of wounds and of bloodshed to our husbands and parents. It were better that we perish than live widowed or fatherless without one or other of you."

The battle came to an end, and the Sabines agreed to unite in one nation with the Romans. Titus Tatius jointly ruled with Romulus until Tatius's death five years later.

The new Sabine residents of Rome settled on the Capitoline Hill, which they had captured in the battle.

== Historical analysis ==
The motivation behind the abduction of the Sabine women is contested among ancient sources. Livy writes that Rome's motivation for abducting the Sabine women was solely to increase the city's population and claims that no direct sexual assault took place during the abduction. Livy says that Romulus offered the Sabine women free choice as well as civic and property rights. According to Livy, Romulus spoke to each of them in person, declaring "that it was all owing to the pride of their parents in denying right of intermarriage to their neighbours. They would live in honourable wedlock, and share all their property and civil rights, and – dearest of all to human nature – would be the mothers of freemen." Scholars like Dionysius of Halicarnassus argue that it was an attempt to secure an alliance with the Sabines through the women's newly founded relationships with Roman men. Livy's account is reinforced in some ways through the works of Cicero. In Cicero's work De re publica, he reiterates Livy's view that the plan to abduct the Sabine women at the festival was done in order "to strengthen the new state" and "safeguard the resources of his kingdom and people." Unlike Livy, Cicero, and Dionysius, Ovid sees the abduction of the Sabine as an avenue for the men of Rome to fulfill their sexual desires rather than an attempt at taking wives to produce children for the city. While he does make note of the issue surrounding Rome's lack of women, he does not make it out to be a factor in the planning of the abduction.

While it is clear that the story was part of the founding mythology of Rome, its historicity is disputed and considered unlikely to have happened by many historians, or at least not to have happened in the way described. Theodor Mommsen (as well as later historians such as Jacques Poucet) believed that the story was likely spread during the later fourth century BC after the Samnite Wars as a tale to explain the assimilation of Samnites into Rome after a combination of wars and alliances, and sending similar events into the distant past. The story likely gained relevance again during the time period where the coins depicting the event were minted, in 89 BC. This would have been made during the Social War, a conflict between Rome and its Italian allies over their status and whether they deserved Roman citizenship. A story from Rome's past wherein Rome came into conflict with its neighbors, showed a capacity for brutal violence, but ultimately avoided a war after the Sabines submitted to unification with Rome, would have been a powerful one for Rome to send at the time.

== Artistic representations ==
Many treatments of the legend combined a suitably inspiring example of the hardiness and courage of ancient Romans with the opportunity to depict multiple figures, including heroically semi-nude figures in intensely passionate struggle.

The subject was popular during the Renaissance as symbolising the importance of marriage for the continuity of families and cultures. It was also an example of a battle subject in which the artist could demonstrate his skill in depicting female as well as male figures in extreme poses, with the added advantage of a sexual theme. It was depicted regularly on 15th-century Italian cassoni and later in larger paintings. A comparable opportunity from the New Testament was afforded by the theme of the Massacre of the Innocents.

=== Giambologna ===
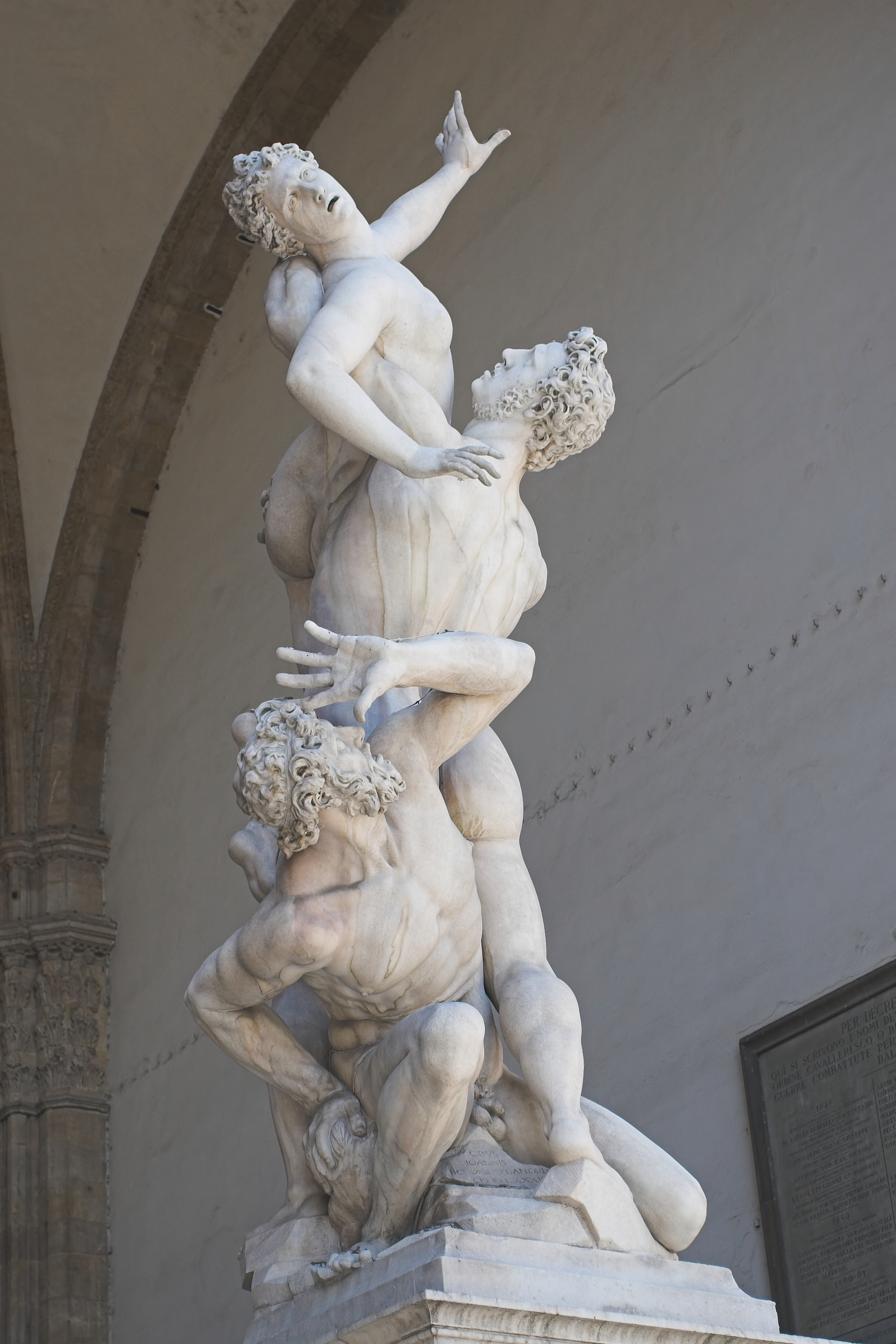
Abduction of a Sabine Woman by Giambologna, Loggia dei Lanzi, Florence

The 16th-century Italo-Flemish sculptor Giambologna sculpted a representation of this theme with three figures (a man lifting a woman into the air while a second man crouches), carved from a single block of marble. This sculpture is considered Giambologna's masterpiece. Originally intended as nothing more than a demonstration of the artist's ability to create a complex sculptural group, its subject matter, the legendary rape of the Sabines, had to be invented after Francesco I de' Medici, Grand Duke of Tuscany, decreed that it be put on public display in the Loggia dei Lanzi in Piazza della Signoria, Florence.

The proposed site for the sculpture, opposite Benvenuto Cellini's statue of Perseus, prompted suggestions that the group should illustrate a theme related to the former work, such as the rape of Andromeda by Phineus. The respective rapes of Proserpina and Helen were also mooted as possible themes. It was eventually decided that the sculpture was to be identified as one of the Sabine virgins.

The work is signed OPVS IOANNIS BOLONII FLANDRI MDLXXXII ("The work of Johannes of Boulogne of Flanders, 1582"). An early preparatory bronze featuring only two figures is in the Museo Nazionale di Capodimonte in Naples. Giambologna then revised the scheme, this time with a third figure, in two wax models now in the Victoria and Albert Museum, London. The artist's full-scale gesso for the finished sculpture, executed in 1582, is on display at the Galleria dell'Accademia in Florence.

The woman and the kneeling man reference figures from the ancient sculpture Laocoön and His Sons.

Bronze reductions of the sculpture, produced in Giambologna's own studio and imitated by others, were a staple of connoisseurs' collections into the 19th century.

=== Nicolas Poussin ===
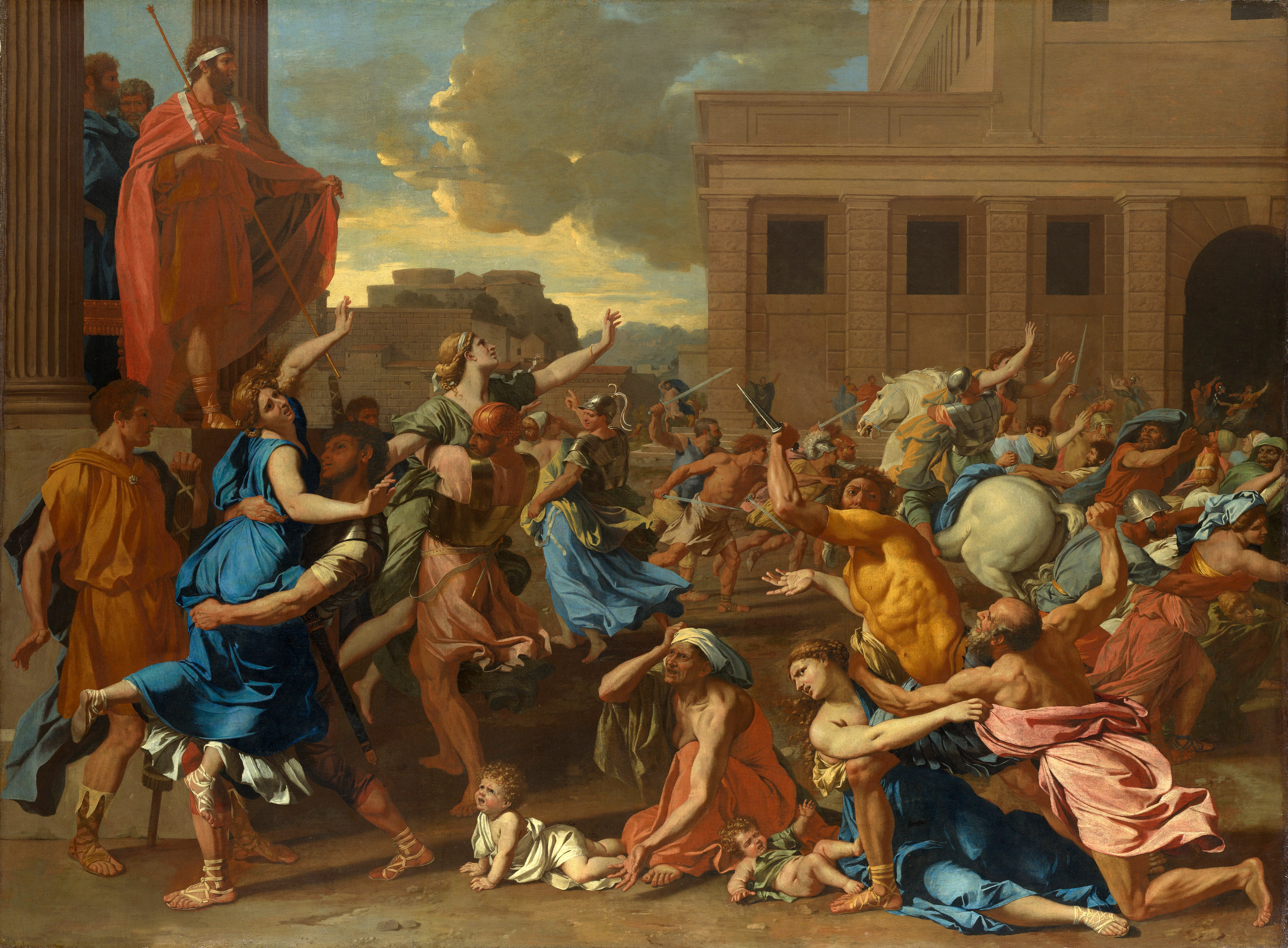
The Abduction of the Sabine Women, by Poussin, 1634–35 (Metropolitan Museum of Art)

Nicolas Poussin produced two major versions of this subject. His initial version is now called The Abduction of the Sabine Women and was most likely completed around 1633–1634. The painting depicts Romulus giving the signal to the Romans for the abduction. According to the Metropolitan, the subject matter of Poussin's work allowed him to highlight his understanding of pose and gesture as well as his knowledge of Roman architecture. This version of the painting is now in the Metropolitan Museum of Art in New York City.

Poussin's second version, entitled The Rape of the Sabine Women, is essentially a recreation of his original work and was likely completed around 1637–1638. The architectural setting of this work is more developed than in the original. This painting is now in the Louvre Museum in Paris. Painting multiple versions of one subject was not uncommon throughout Poussin's career.

=== Peter Paul Rubens ===
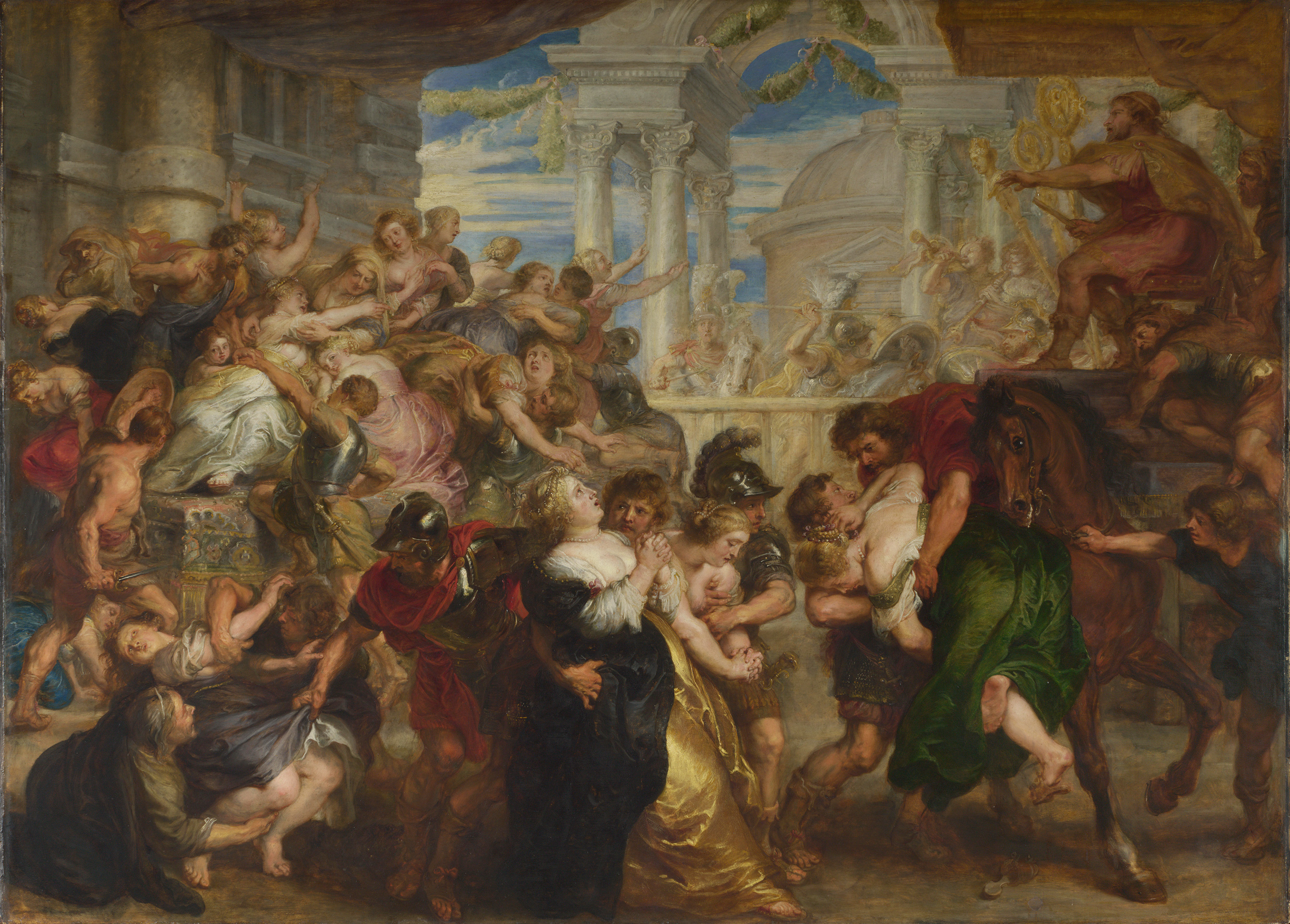
The Rape of the Sabine Women, by Peter Paul Rubens

Peter Paul Rubens painted his version of The Rape of the Sabine Women around 1635–40. It now resides in the National Gallery, London. The painting depicts the moment Romulus gave the signal for the Romans to abduct the Sabine women. Rubens emphasizes the violence of the abduction and sexualizes it by depicting women with exposed breasts and a soldier lifting up a woman's skirt.

=== Pietro da Cortona ===
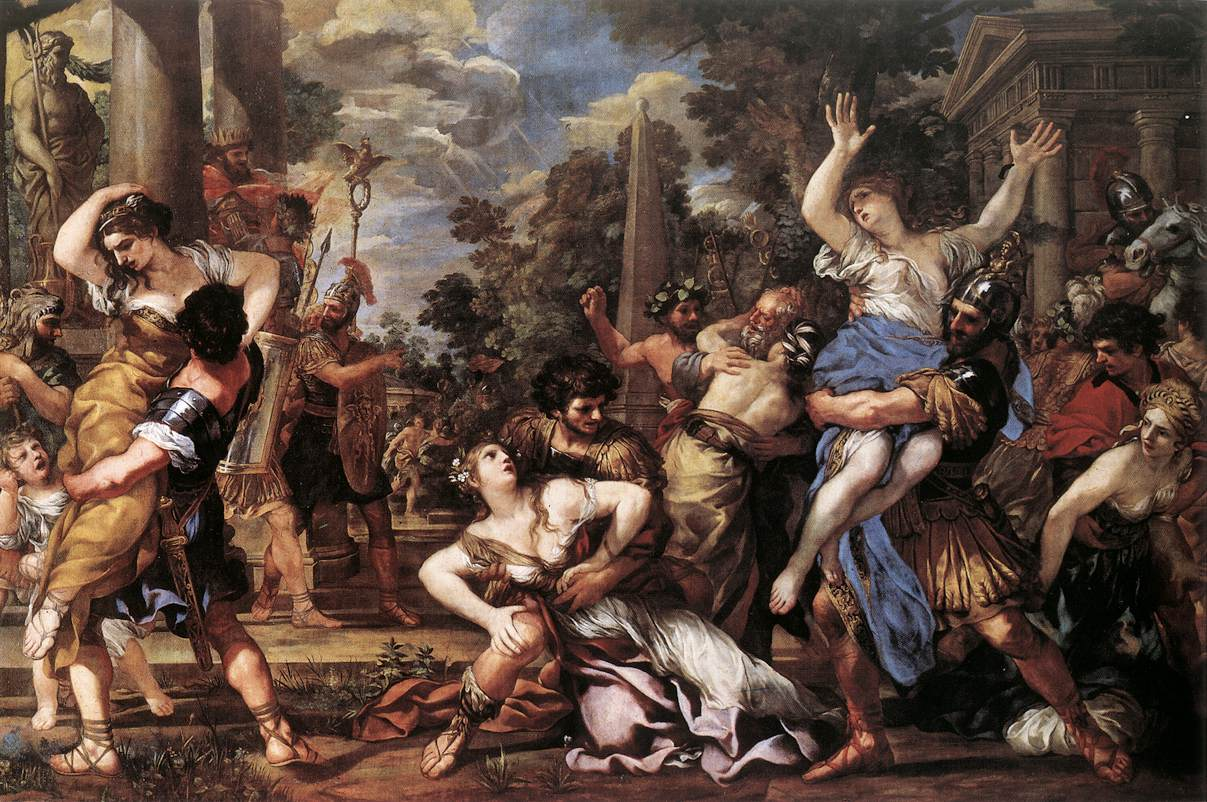
Rape of the Sabine Women by Pietro da Cortona, 1627–1629

Pietro da Cortona depicted the rape of the Sabines at least twice.

=== Luca Giordano ===
There are at least eight paintings by Luca Giordano or his workshop on this subject.

=== Johann Heinrich Schönfeld ===
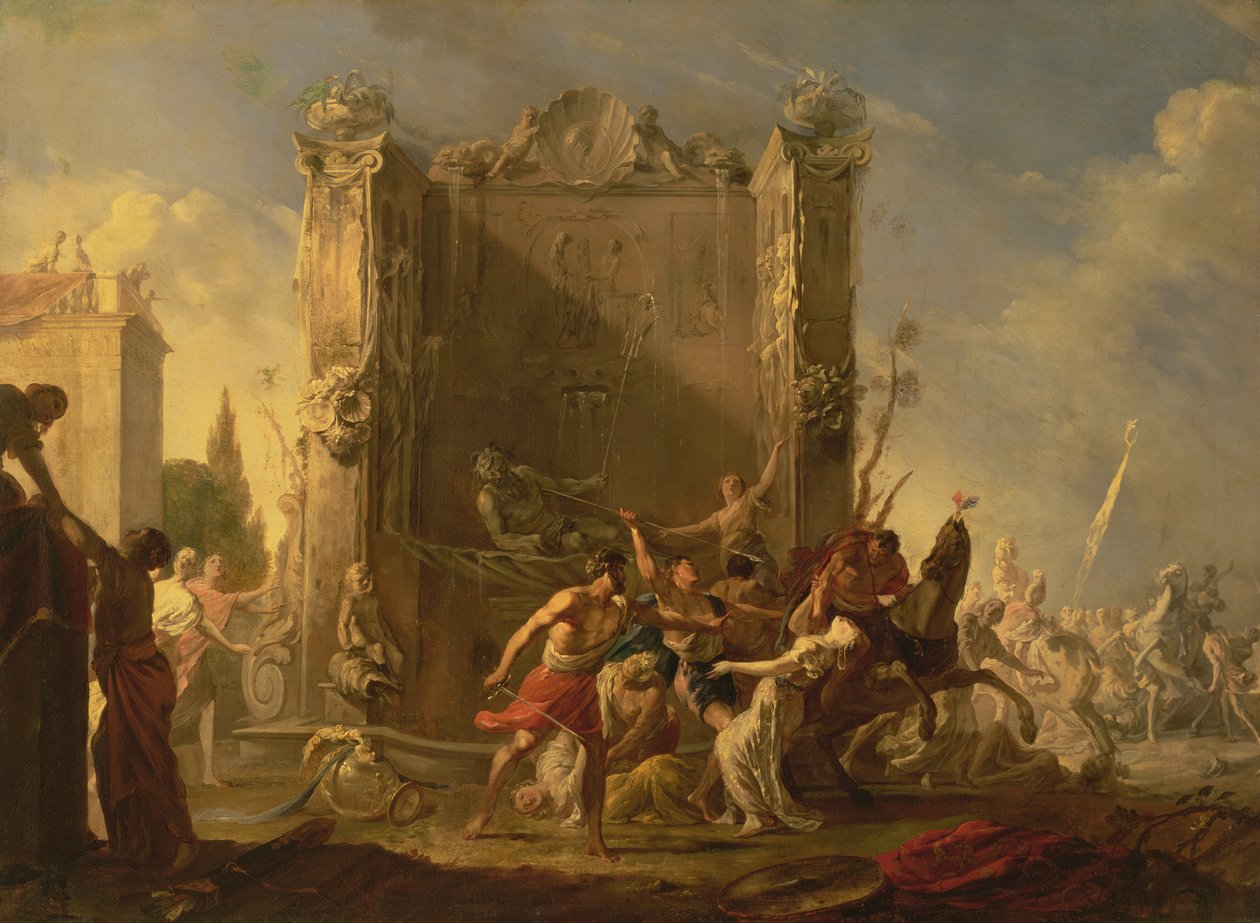
The Rape of the Sabine Women by Johann Heinrich Schönfeld

Johann Heinrich Schönfeld painted a version of this subject entitled The Rape of the Sabine Women in the late 1630s. His work now resides at the State Hermitage Museum in St. Petersburg.

=== Jacques Stella ===
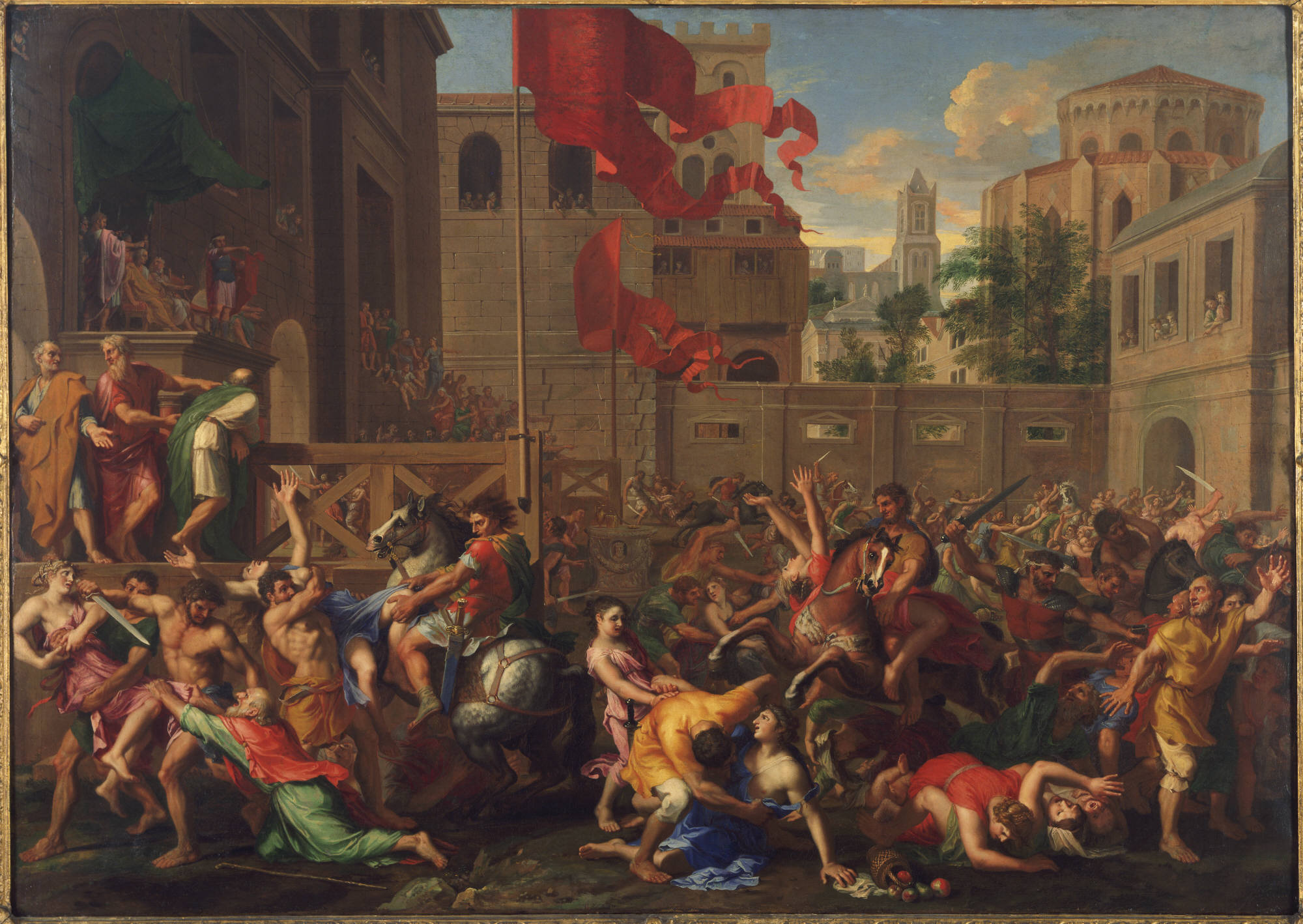
Jacques Stella, The Rape of the Sabines, mid-17th century (Princeton University Art Museum)

Jacques Stella painted a version of the rape of the Sabine women entitled The Rape of the Sabines in the mid-17th century. Stella's depiction of the scene is said to have so closely resembled Nicholas Poussin's works that following his death his version was mistaken for a Poussin. This work now resides at Princeton University's Art Museum.

=== Jacques-Louis David ===
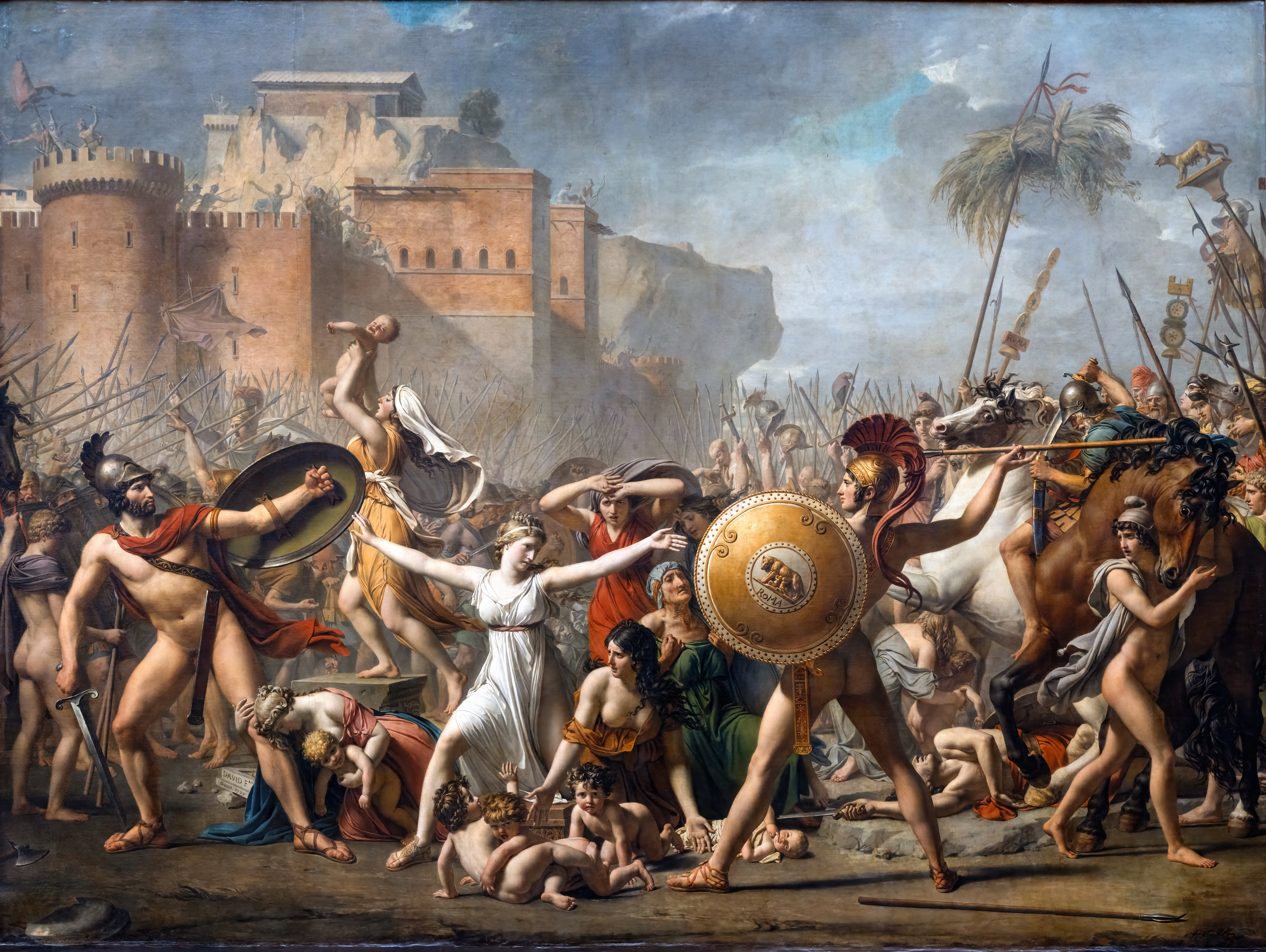
The Intervention of the Sabine Women, 1799

Jacques-Louis David painted the other end of the story, when the women intervene to reconcile the warring parties. The Sabine Women Enforcing Peace by Running Between the Combatants (also known as The Intervention of the Sabine Women) was completed in 1799. It is in the Louvre Museum.

David had begun work on it in 1796, when France was at war with other European nations, after a period of civil conflict culminating in the Reign of Terror and the Thermidorian Reaction, during which David himself had been imprisoned as a supporter of Robespierre. After David's estranged wife visited him in jail, he conceived the idea of telling the story to honor his wife, with the theme being love prevailing over conflict. The painting was also seen as a plea for the French people to reconcile their differences after the bloodshed of the French Revolution.

The painting depicts Romulus's wife Hersilia – the daughter of Titus Tatius, leader of the Sabines – rushing between her husband and her father and placing her babies between them. A vigorous Romulus prepares to strike a half-retreating Tatius with his spear, but hesitates. Other soldiers are already sheathing their swords.

The rocky outcrop in the background is the Tarpeian Rock.

=== John Leech ===
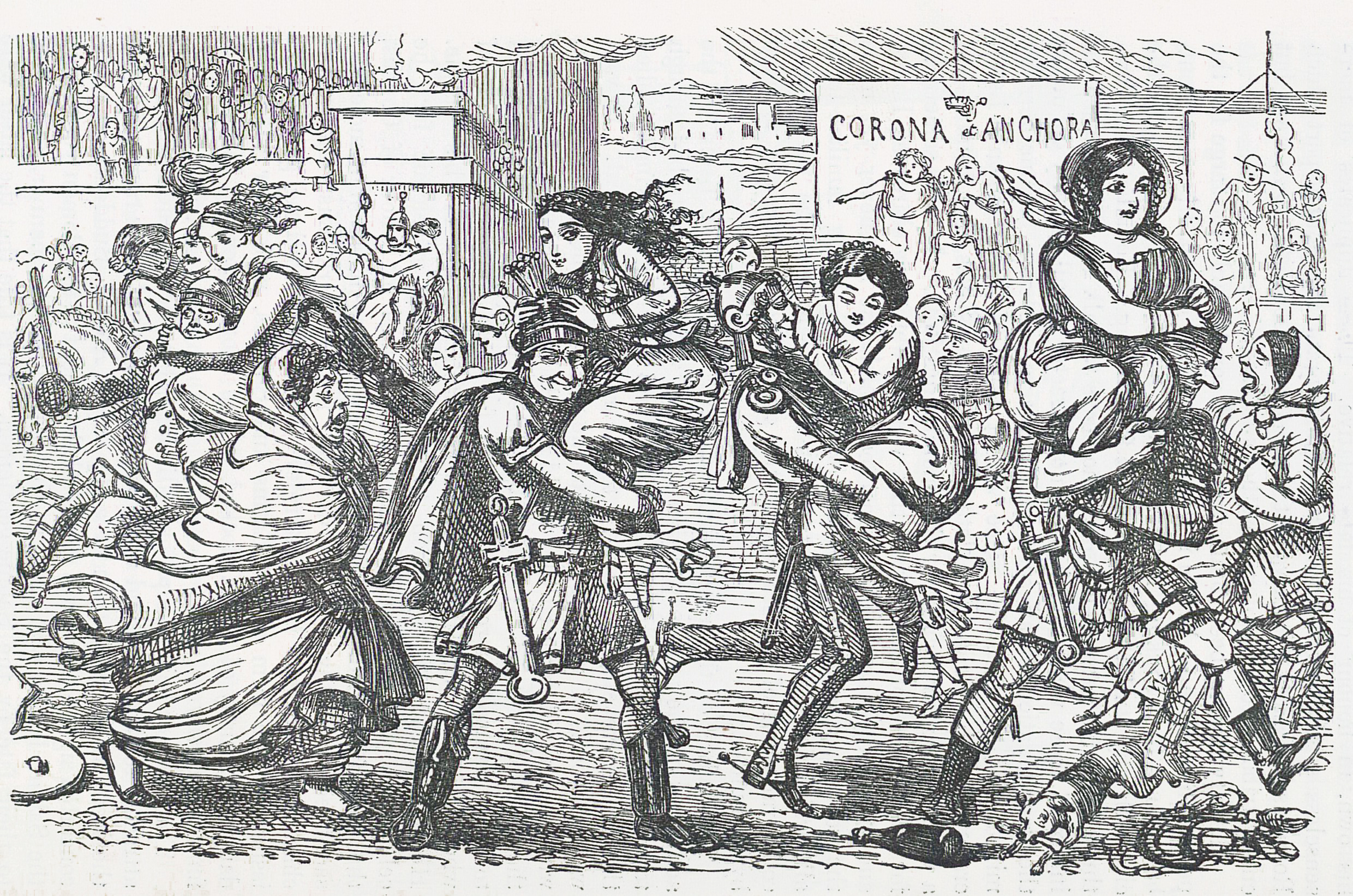
John Leech's satirical version of The Rape of the Sabine Women

The English 19th-century satirical painter John Leech included in his The Comic History of Rome a depiction of the rape of the Sabine women, where the women are portrayed, with a deliberate anachronism, in Victorian costume and being carried off from the Corona et Anchora ("Crown and Anchor", a common English pub sign in seafaring towns).

=== Edgar Degas ===
Edgar Degas painted The Rape of the Sabines (after Poussin), c. 1861–1862.

"The masters must be copied over and over again", Degas said, "and it is only after proving yourself a good copyist that you should reasonably be permitted to draw a radish from nature." Degas first received permission to copy paintings at the Louvre in 1853 when he was eighteen. He was most interested in the great works of the Italian Renaissance and of his own classical French heritage, hence this detailed copy of Poussin's painting.

=== Charles Christian Nahl ===
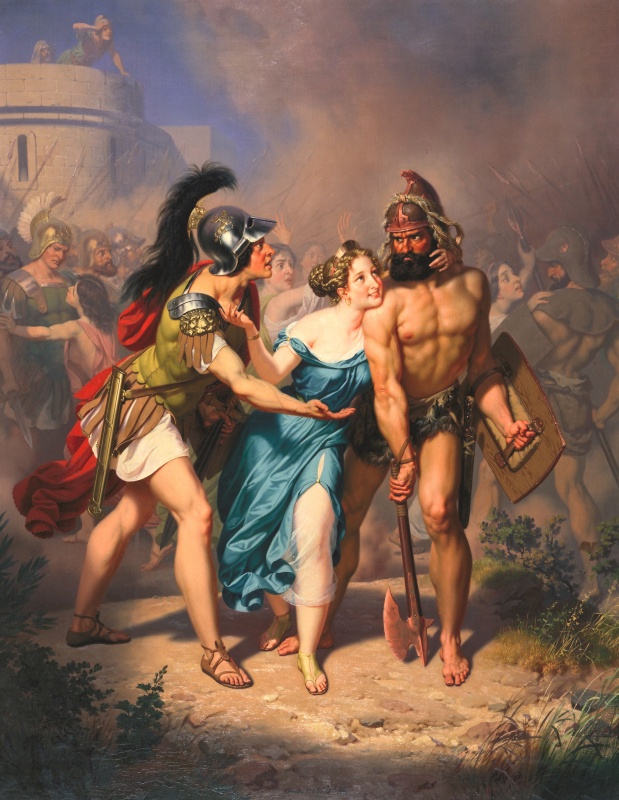
The Invasion by Charles Christian Nahl (1871)

Charles Christian Nahl painted the subject in a trio of works entitled The Abduction, The Captivity, and The Invasion.

=== Pablo Picasso ===
Pablo Picasso visited this theme in his several versions of the Rape of the Sabine Women (1962–63), one of which is in the Museum of Fine Arts, Boston. These are based on David's version. These conflate the beginning and end of the story, depicting the brutish Romulus and Tatius ignoring and trampling on the exposed figure of Hersilia and her child.

== Literature and performing arts ==
=== Ancient works ===
The episode of the rape of the Sabine women is recounted by Cicero, Livy, Dionysius of Halicarnassus, and Plutarch. The poetry of Ovid also contains several allusions to this episode and it is included on the shield of Aeneas in Virgil's Aeneid.

=== Modern works ===
The Sabine women are mentioned in Canto VI of Dante's Paradiso.

The midrash Sefer haYashar (first attested in 1624) portrays the story as part of a war between the Sabines, descended from Tubal, and the Kittim (Romans) (Jasher 17:1–15). This narrative is better detailed in the earlier medieval rabbinic work Yosippon.

The story was parodied by Lady Carlotta, the mischief-making character in Saki's short story "The Schartz-Metterklume Method".

Stephen Vincent Benét wrote a short story called "The Sobbin' Women" that parodied the legend. Later adapted into the 1954 musical Seven Brides for Seven Brothers, it tells the story of seven gauche but sincere backwoodsmen, one of whom gets married, encouraging the others to seek partners. After a social where they meet girls they are attracted to, they are denied the chance to pursue their courtship by the latter's menfolk. Following the Roman example, they abduct the girls. As in the original tale, the women are initially indignant but eventually won over.

In 1962, a Mexican "sword-and-sandal" film based on the story was made, directed by Alberto Gout. Titled El Rapto de las Sabinas, the film was released in the USA under the titles The Rape of the Sabine Women and The Shame of the Sabine Women.

Tom Stoppard's play Rosencrantz and Guildenstern Are Dead (1966) features a group of all-male players offering to perform The Rape of the Sabine Women, to the disgust of the title characters.

The latest adaptation is a film without dialogue, The Rape of the Sabine Women, which was produced in 2005 by Eve Sussman and the Rufus Corporation.

The rape of the Sabine women is depicted in Debra Macleod’s historical fiction novel Tarpiea.

== Cultural context ==
The 18th-century artist Niccolò Bambini painted the subject at least twice.

Scholars have cited parallels between the rape of the Sabine women, the Æsir–Vanir War in Norse mythology, and the Iliad of Greek mythology, providing support for a Proto-Indo-European "war of the functions". Regarding these parallels, J. P. Mallory states:

Basically, the parallels concern the presence of first-(magico-juridical) and second-(warrior) function representatives on the victorious side of a war that ultimately subdues and incorporates third function characters, for example, the Sabine women or the Norse Vanir. Indeed, the Iliad itself has also been examined in a similar light. The ultimate structure of the myth, then, is that the three estates of Proto-Indo-European society were fused only after a war between the first two against the third.

== Adaptations ==
- Romulus and the Sabines (Italian: Il ratto delle sabine – 1961, film)
- The Rape of the Sabine Women (1962 film)
- Seven Brides for Seven Brothers
- Amor et Potentia – 2024 novel

== See also ==
- Amazonomachy
- Lapiths
- Stockholm syndrome
- Ukuthwalwa
- Levite's Concubine

== Bibliography ==
=== Ancient sources ===
- Livy, Ab urbe condita, Book 1, 9–13 (Latin), Book 1 9–13 (English)

=== Modern sources ===
- Michael Crawford, Roman Republican Coinage, Cambridge University Press, 1974–2001.
- Walter Friedlaender, Nicolas Poussin: A New Approach (New York: Abrams), 1964.
- Mallory, J. P (2005). In Search of the Indo-Europeans. Thames & Hudson. ISBN 0-500-27616-1
- Pope-Hennessy, John, Italian High Renaissance & Baroque Sculpture, London: Phaidon, 1996.
