= The Abduction of the Sabine Women =

The Abduction of the Sabine Women may refer to:

- The Abduction of the Sabine Women (play), a German theatre play
- The Abduction of the Sabine Women (1928 film), a German silent comedy film
- The Abduction of the Sabine Women (1936 film), a German comedy film
- The Abduction of the Sabine Women (1954 film), a West German musical comedy film

== See also ==
- The Rape of the Sabine Women (disambiguation)
