= Rhea Silvia =

Mythical mother of Romulus and Remus

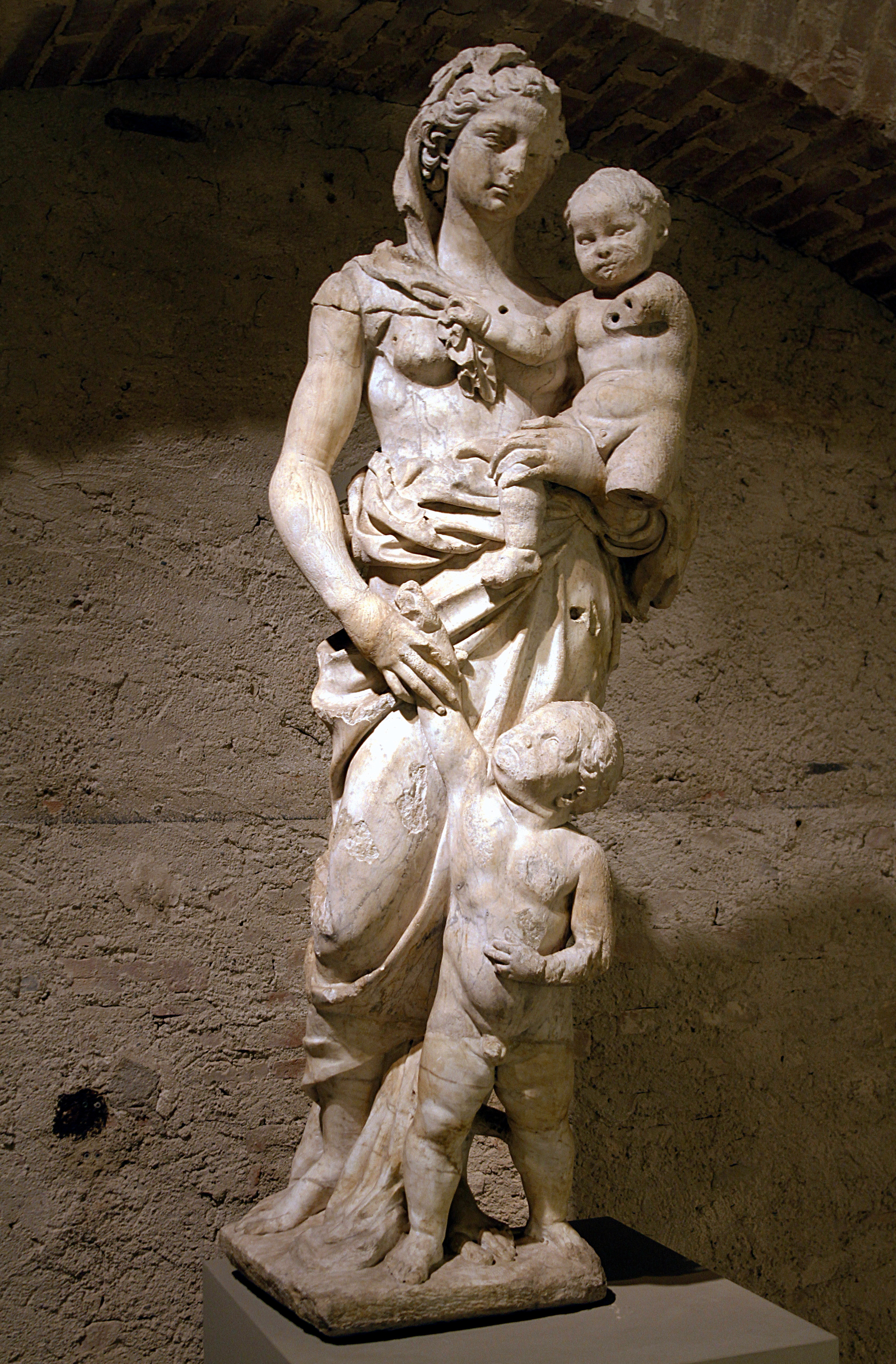
- Statue in the Fonte Gaia
- Abode: Tiber

Genealogy
- Parents: Numitor (in Livy's account)
- Consort: Mars, Tiberinus
- Children: Romulus and Remus

Rhea (or Rea) Silvia (Latin: [ˈreːa ˈsɪɫu̯ia]), also known as Ilia, (as well as other names) (Note: These include Servilia and Aemilia) was the mythical mother of the twins Romulus and Remus, who founded the city of Rome. Rhea was a Vestal Virgin who became pregnant with the twins after being impregnated by the god Mars; after giving birth, they were taken from her and raised by a she-wolf.

These events were frequently portrayed in Roman art and literature. Her story is documented by Livy in the first book of his Ab Urbe Condita Libri, and in Cassius Dio's Roman History. It is additionally mentioned in the Aeneid and in the works of Ovid.

== Legend ==
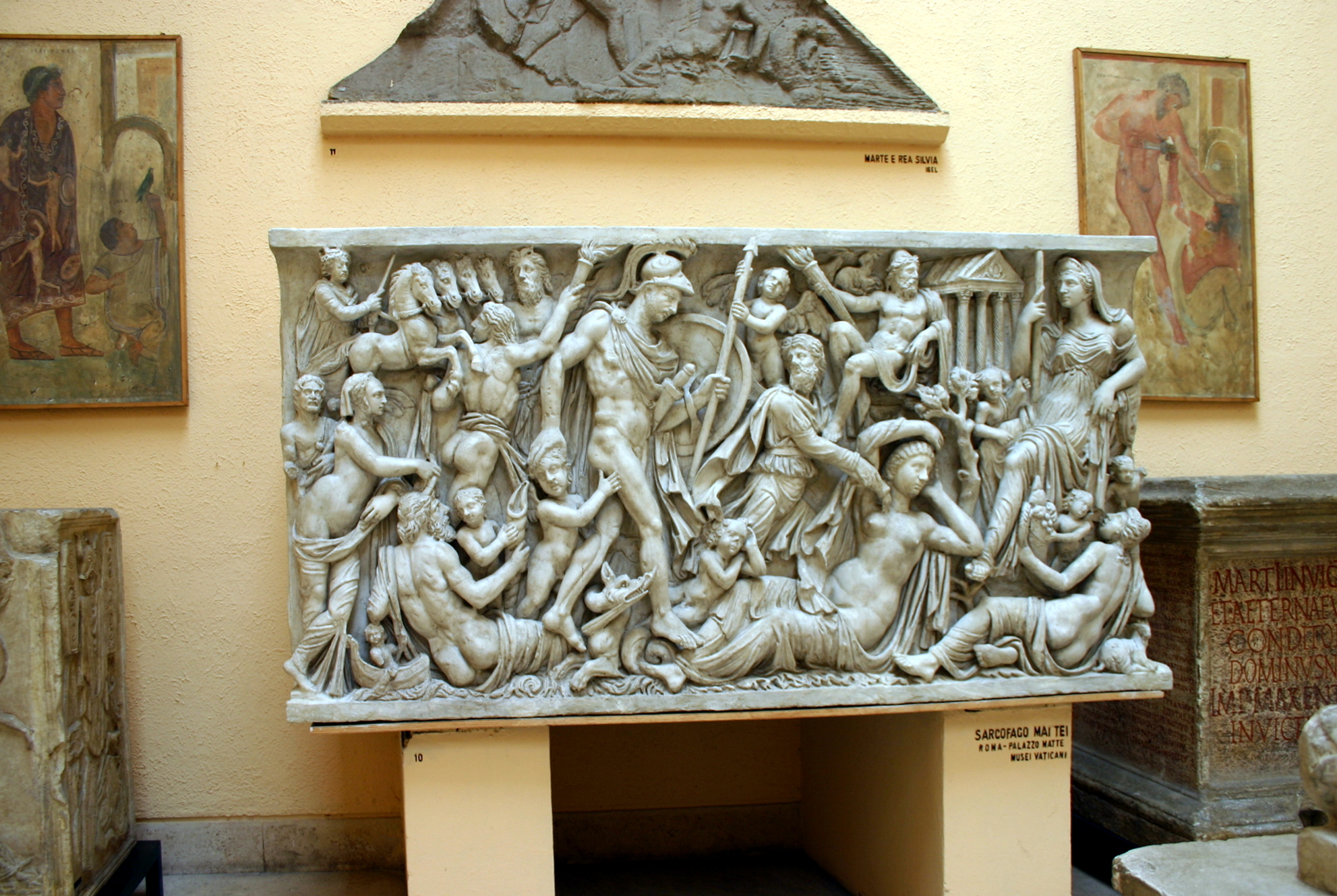
Symbolic representation of the Rhea Silvia myth on a sarcophagus in the Palazzo Mattei. Most of the elements of the story can be found in the scene. The central figure, Mars, strides over Rhea Silvia being put to sleep by Somnus pouring the juice of sleep on her from a horn. The wolf, the personification of the river, the temple of Vesta, are all present.

According to the Roman historian Livy's account of the legend, Rhea Silvia was the daughter of Numitor, king of Alba Longa and descendant of Aeneas. Numitor's younger brother Amulius seized the throne and killed Numitor's son, then forced Rhea Silvia to become a Vestal Virgin, a priestess of the goddess Vesta. As Vestal Virgins were sworn to celibacy, this would ensure the line of Numitor had no heirs. Rhea, however, became pregnant with the twins Romulus and Remus by the god Mars.

According to Plutarch, she believed this because she saw her children being cared for by a woodpecker and a wolf— animals sacred to Mars. The account says that Rhea Silvia went to a grove sacred to Mars to get water for use in the temple; there she encountered Mars, who attempted to rape her. She ran into a cave to escape him but to no avail. Mars then promised that her children would be great. These claims of her children's paternity were, however, doubted by Livy.

Vesta, to show her displeasure at the birth of Rhea Silvia's children, caused the holy fire in her temple to go out, shook her altar, and shut the eyes of her image. According to Ennius, the goddess Venus was more sympathetic to Rhea Silvia's plight.

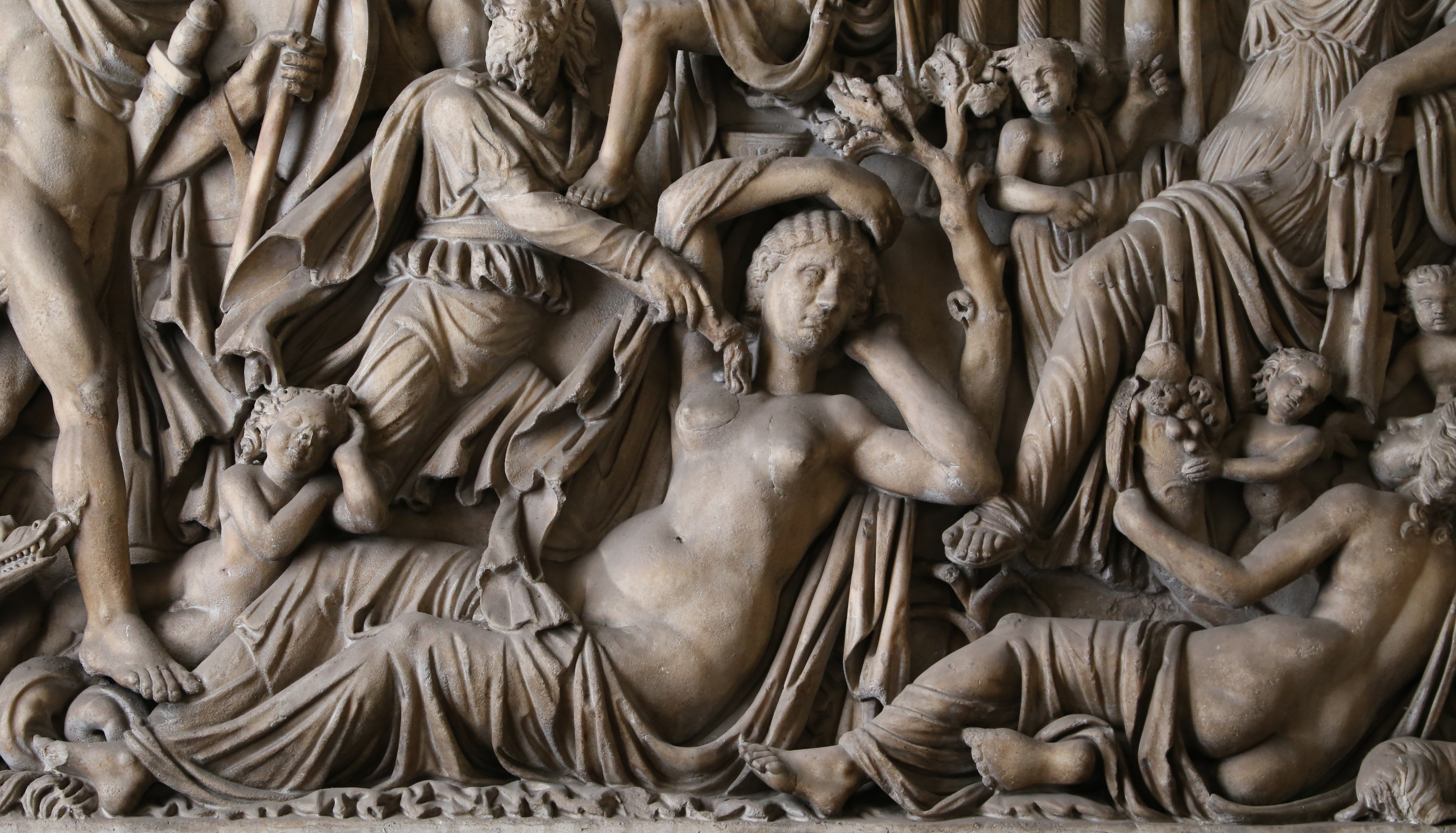
Rhea Silvia portrayed on a sarcophagus

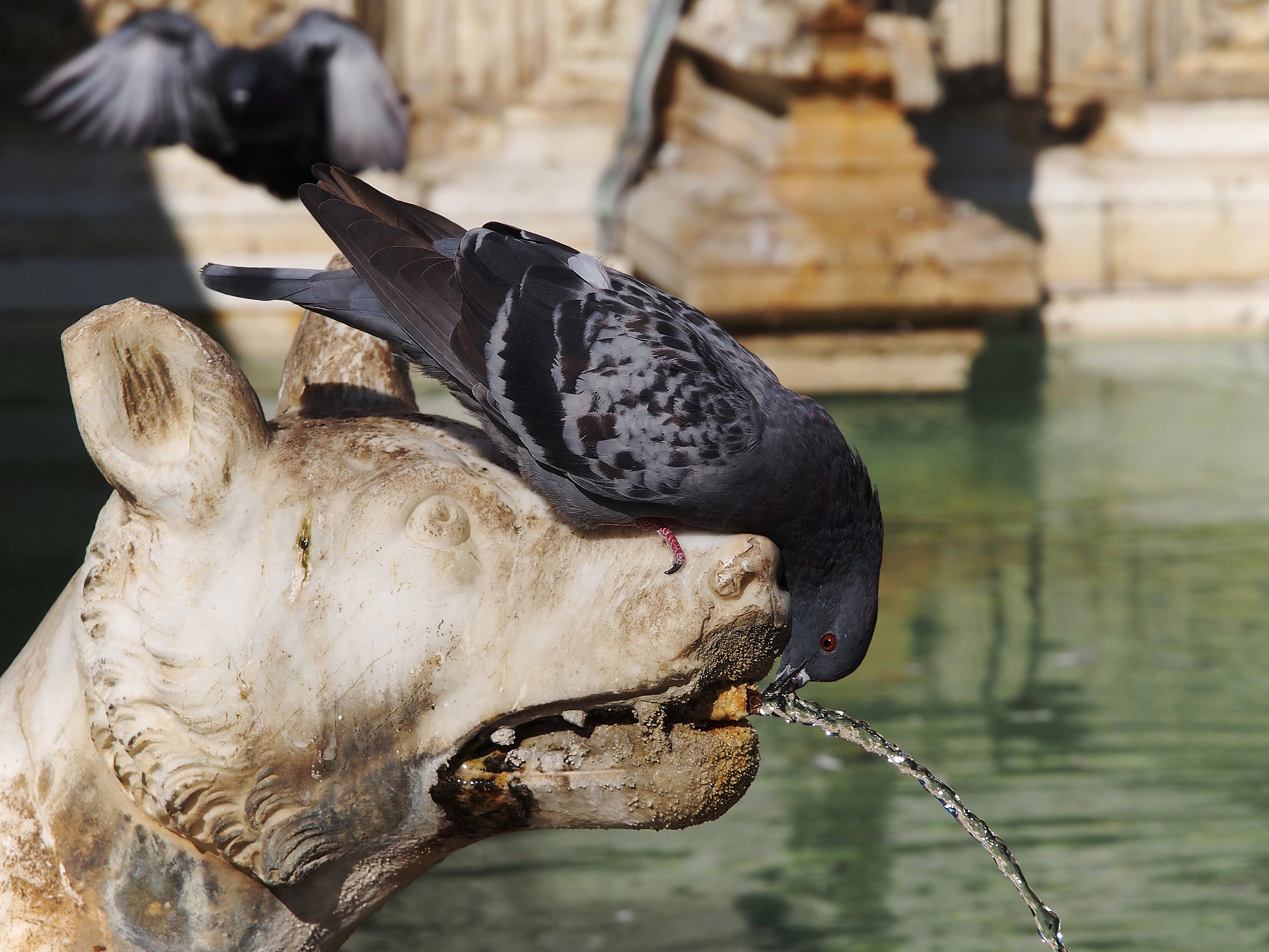
She-wolf (lupa) in Fonte Gaia, 14th century

When Amulius learned of the birth, he imprisoned Rhea Silvia and ordered a servant to kill the twins. However, the servant showed mercy and set them adrift on the river Tiber, which, overflowing, left the infants in a pool by the bank. There, a she-wolf (lupa), who had just lost her own cubs, suckled them. Rhea Silvia was spared from death due to the intercession of Amulius' daughter Antho. An early Latin tradition, related by Ennius, says she was thrown into the Tiber on Amulius' orders. However, according to Ovid, Rhea Silvia ultimately threw herself into the Tiber.

Romulus and Remus overthrew Amulius and reinstated Numitor as king in 752 BCE. They would then go to found Rome.

== In Roman art ==
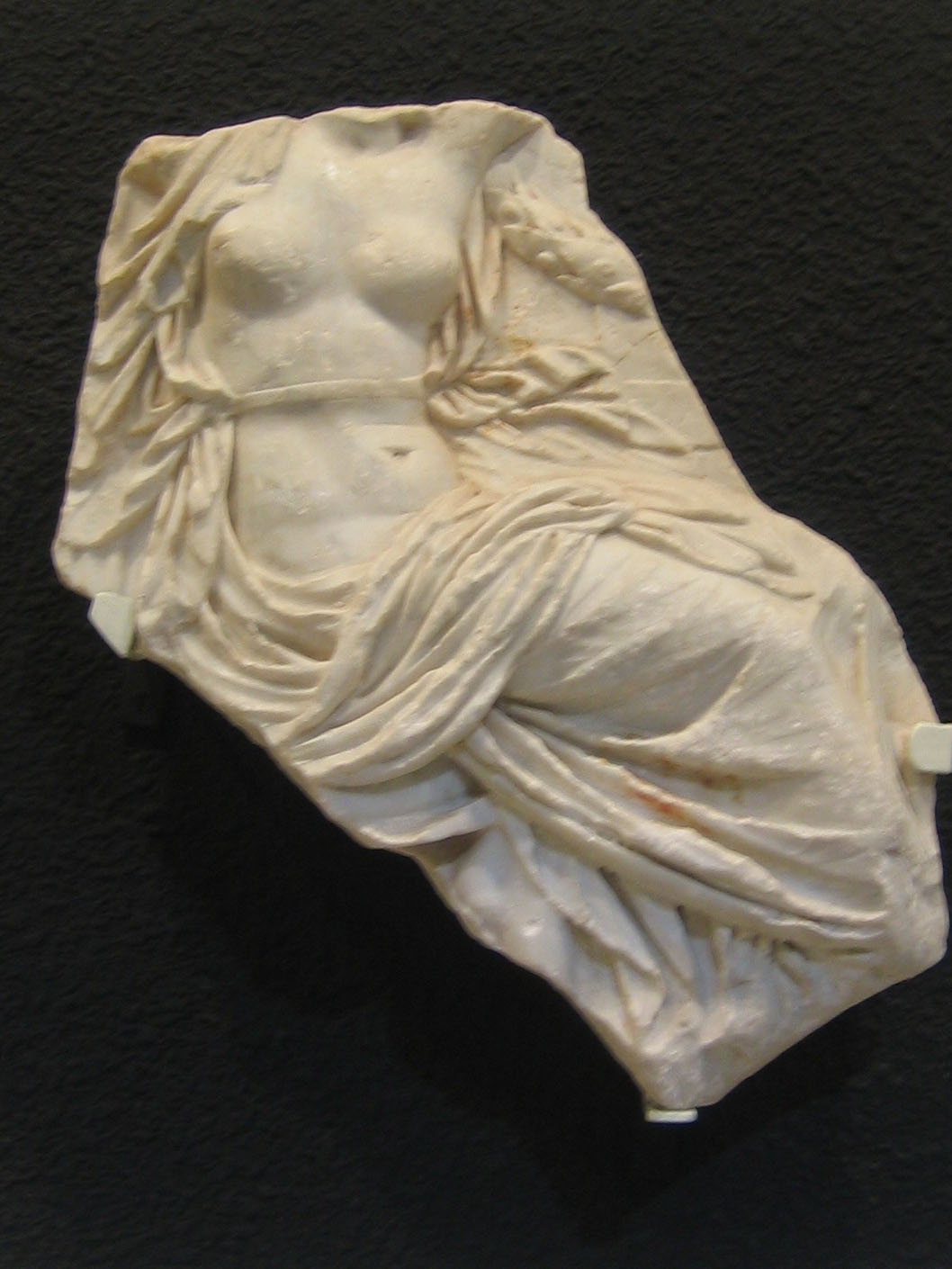
Rhea Silvia, torso from the Roman theatre, Cartagena, Spain that was rediscovered in 1988.

Despite Livy's euhemerist and realist deflation of this myth, it is clear that the story of her seduction by Mars continued to be widely accepted. This is demonstrated by the recurring theme of Mars discovering Rhea Silvia in Roman arts: in bas-relief on the Casali Altar (Vatican Museums), in engraved couched glass on the Portland Vase (British Museum), and on a sarcophagus in the Palazzo Mattei. Mars' discovery of Rhea Silvia is a prototype of the "invention scene" ("discovery scene") familiar in Roman art; Greek examples are furnished by Dionysus and Ariadne as well as Selene and Endymion.

The Portland Vase features a scene that has been interpreted as a depiction of the "invention", or coming-upon, of Rhea Sylvia by Mars.

In the Museo Nazionale Romano there is a depiction in a relief of Rhea Silvia sleeping during the conception of Romulus and Remus.

== In Roman literature ==
In a version presented by Ovid's Fasti, it is the river Anio who takes pity on her and invites her to rule his realm.

In Virgil's Aeneid, Anchises gives a prophecy that Rhea Silvia would give birth to Romulus and Remus by Mars.

Rhea Silvia's bearing of Romulus is mentioned in the Roman work, Vigil of Venus.

== Academic analyses ==
- In an article by Rosanna Lauriola, Rhea Silvia is held up as an example of how rape victims in Roman myths are valued more as the mothers and catalysts for change than as individuals in their own right.
- A paper by Revika Gersht and Sonia Muryink divides the images of Rhea Silvia's conception by Mars into as many as seven different types.

== Modern literature ==
- In David Drake's science fiction story "To Bring the Light", the time travelling protagonist meets a completely human Rhea Silvia, a sympathetic peasant living in a small shepherd community on Palatine Hill in what would become the city of Rome.
- In Rick Riordan's novel The Mark of Athena, Annabeth Chase meets Rhea Silvia and the god of the river Tiber in the forms of Audrey Hepburn and Gregory Peck's characters from the movie Roman Holiday.
- Rhea Silvia is the central character in Debra May Macleod's historical fiction novel Rhea Silvia (2022).
- The novel Mother of Rome (2025) by Lauren J. A. Bear retells the story of Rhea Silvia.

== See also ==
- Ilia (name)
- Aeneas
- Founding of Rome
- Rhea (mythology)
- Tiberinus (god)
