= Tarpeia =

Daughter of the Roman commander Spurius Tarpeius

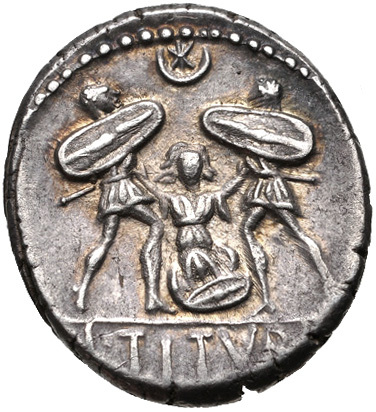
Reverse of a denarius (89 BCE) depicting the torture of Tarpeia

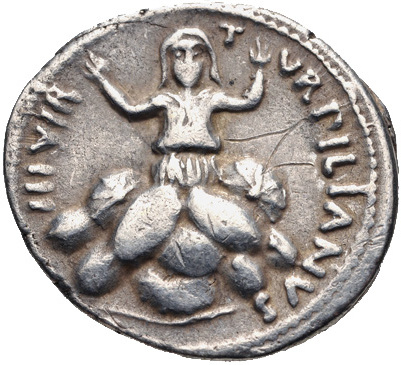
Reverse of a denarius (19-18 BCE) of Augustus showing Tarpeia crushed by the soldiers' shields

In Roman legend, Tarpeia (/tɑːrˈpiːə/; mid-8th century BCE), daughter of the Roman commander Spurius Tarpeius, was a Vestal Virgin who betrayed the city of Rome to the Sabines at the time of their women's abduction for what she thought would be a reward of jewelry. She was instead crushed to death by Sabine shields and her body cast from the southern Rock (Rupes Tarpeia).

== Legend ==
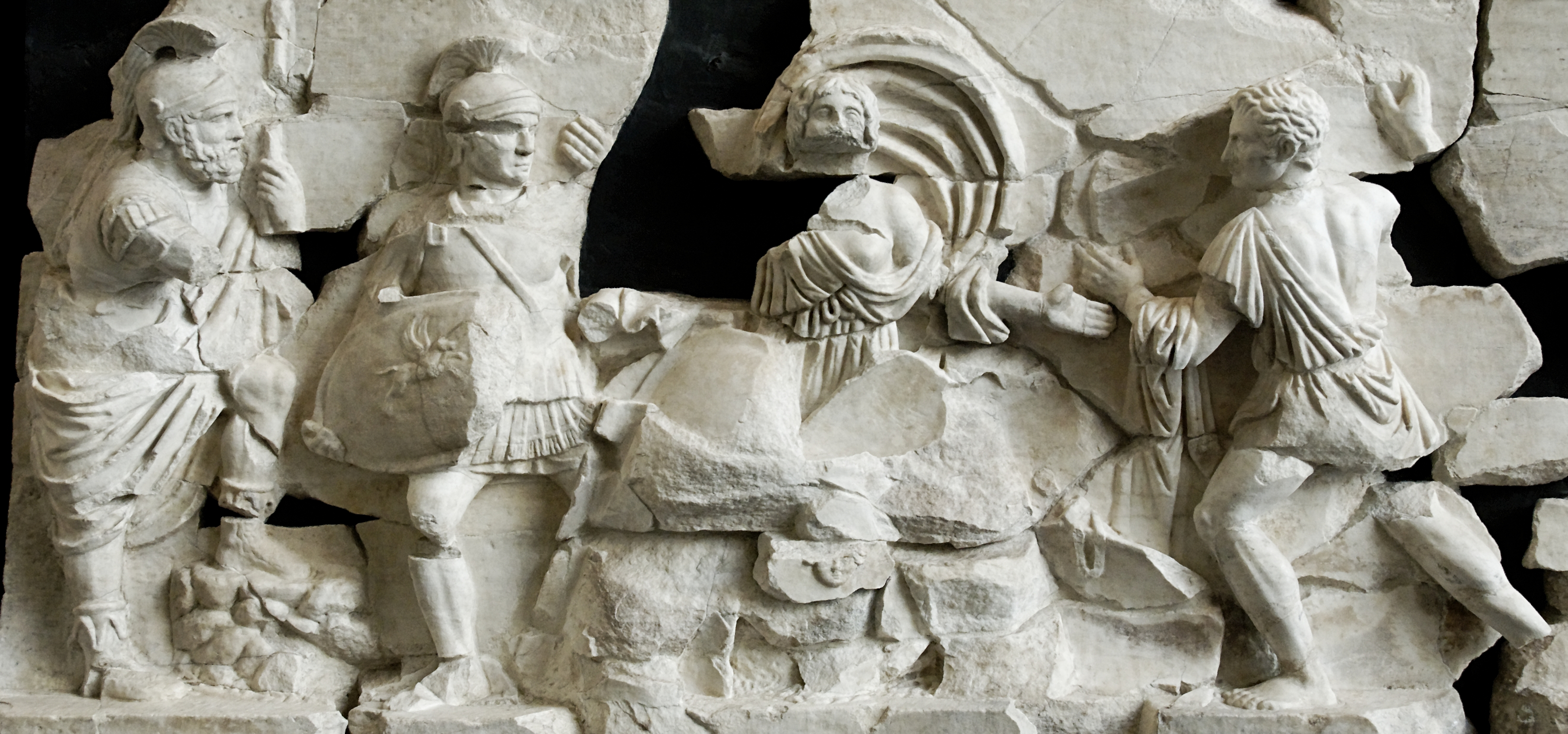
Soldiers attacking Tarpeia, on a fragmentary relief from the frieze of the Basilica Aemilia (1st century CE)

The legend tells that while Rome was besieged by the Sabine king Titus Tatius, Tarpeia, a Vestal Virgin and daughter of the commander of the citadel, Spurius Tarpeius, approached the Sabine camp and offered them entry to the city in exchange for "what they bore on their left arms". Greedy for gold, she had meant their bracelets, but instead the Sabines threw their shields—carried on the left arm—upon her, crushing her to death. Her body was then hurled from (or, according to some accounts, buried at) a steep cliff of the southern summit of the Capitoline Hill. The Sabines were however unable to conquer the Forum, its gates miraculously protected by boiling jets of water created by Janus.

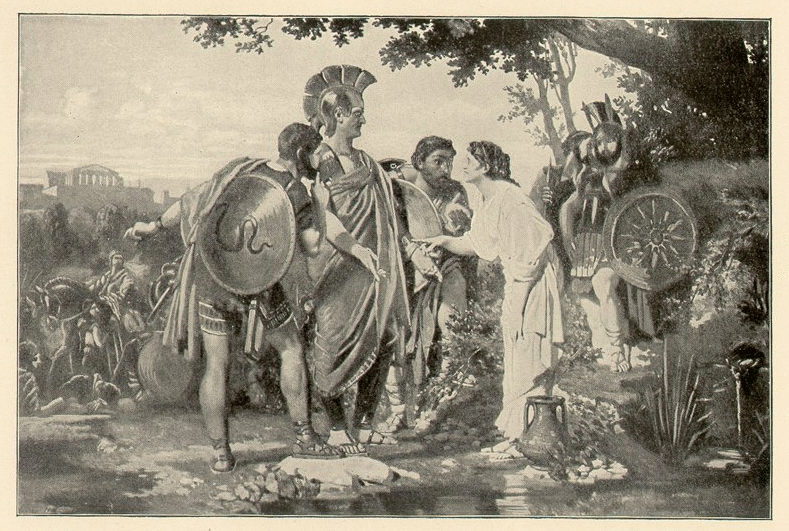
The Sabines Tempting Tarpeia to Betray Rome. 19th century illustration

The legend was depicted in 89 BC by Sabinus following the Civil Wars as well as on a silver denarius of the Emperor Augustus in approximately 20 BC. Tarpeia would later become a symbol of betrayal and greed in Rome. The cliff from which she was thrown was named the Tarpeian Rock, and would become the place of execution for Rome's most notorious traitors. Traitors and murderers were reported to have been thrown off the Tarpeian Rock, which extended over a steep drop from the Capitol. The exact positioning of the rock is debated. Varro asserts that it was near the Temple of Jupiter Capitolinus, whereas Dionysius of Halicarnassus asserts that it was located in the southeast above the Roman Forum.

== Accounts ==
=== Livy ===
Livy’s account uses information from Fabius, Dionysius, and Piso, all of which had existing accounts of Tarpeia prior to Livy. The previous writers form the base story of the myth which is told in the legend. A unique detail that Livy adds is the suggestion that Tarpeia was not greedily looking for gold, but was trying to trick the Sabines into giving up their weapons once she let them in. Livy writes:

There are some who say that, from the agreement of handing over what was on their left hands, what she really sought was their weapons and that, having appeared to act in fraud, she was undone by her own “wage”.

=== Varro ===
Varro’s account of Tarpeia is nearly the same as Livy’s, however, Varro includes that Tarpeia was a Vestal. Varro added this detail when Plutarch wrote that one of the first four Vestals was named Tarpeia. This added detail is significant since it is now accepted in the myth that Tarpeia was a Vestal. It also paved the way for writers such as Propertius to expand on this detail and add themes of Tarpeia being unchaste, hence why she was greedy.

=== Propertius ===
Propertius’ account is considered to be a production of art. The poem most notably introduced the love affair between Tatius and Tarpeia. This was used because of Varro's addition of Tarpeia being a Vestal Virgin. Since Tarpeia was a Vestal Virgin, love (and therefore sexual desire) could be used as foreshadowing Tarpeia's greed and betrayal to the city of Rome. This artistic approach to the myth makes the story more relatable to Romans and served as a greater symbol of what happens when greed overtakes someone.

=== Plutarch ===
Plutarch's account offers a version of the story which is longer than Livy’s account but closely details the same events. However, compared to Livy, Plutarch only provides one version in which Tarpeia betrays Rome to the Sabines out of her lust for gold and subsequently dies under the weight of the Sabine shields placed upon her.

=== Piso ===
Lucius Calpurnius Piso Frugi, a 2nd century BCE Latin Historian, wrote a more favorable account of Tarpeia which reported that she had no intention of betraying Rome. However, Piso’s actual account of the event does not survive. Piso’s version survives through Dionysius of Halicarnassus’s work. Dionysius of Halicarnassus reports that Piso portrayed Tarpeia as innocent of any treachery, greed, or love for Tatius. He includes the untraditional detail that Tarpeia alerted Romulus about her deal with Tatius to demand the Sabines of their shields. Additionally, Tarpeia subsequently asked Romulus to send troops to the Capitol to correspond with her plan to capture their shields. Piso regarded Tarpeia’s public sacrifice at her tomb as a way to display her position as a national heroine, rather than traitor.

=== Simylos ===
Simylos (Σιμύλος), a Greek 4th century BCE poet, wrote about Tarpeia as well. Eight lines were preserved by Plutarch in which Plutarch criticizes Simylos’ version which details that Tarpeia betrayed Rome to the Gauls, rather than to the Sabines.

=== Antigonos ===
Antigonos (Ἀντίγονος), a 3rd century BCE Greek author, portrays Tarpeia as innocent of treacherous behavior and a model of filial virtue. She was identified as the daughter of Tatius who had been unwillingly made Romulus’ concubine and therefore betrayed Rome for her father.

=== Other Accounts ===
Roman historians Fabius Pictor and Lucius Cincius Alimentus also formulated their own versions of the story of Tarpeia.

Dionysius of Halicarnassus, rather than retelling his own version of the Tarpeia story, compares existing versions from Fabius Pictor, Cincius, and Piso. In the end, he appears to show the most preference for Piso’s more positive and patriotic account.

== Tarpeia as a Vestal Virgin ==
Varro and Propertius most notably identify Tarpeia as a Vestal Virgin. However, her status as a Vestal Virgin is only explicitly established in the works of Varro and the Breviarium Vindobonense from the early 4th century CE. Livy does not explicitly call Tarpeia a Vestal, but he does call her a “virgo”. Roman historians typically say that this translates to her being a Vestal.

The Vestals performed the Parentalia or dies parentales ("ancestral days") on February 13/Ides of February at the tomb of Tarpeia since she herself was considered to be a Vestal. Tarpeia’s status as a Vestal Virgin both positions her as a physical embodiment of religious protection and chastity of the Roman state. Additionally, treason committed by a Vestal Virgin appears to be even more sinful than if committed by an ordinary Roman. Therefore, scholars have debated if Tarpeia’s identity as a Vestal Virgin was invented to symbolically represent the unchaste nature of her act and was not actually an integral part of the story/legend.

== Iconography ==
Only three icons of Tarpeia survive from antiquity: the Basilica Aemilia (c. 1st century BCE), a Republican denarius minted by L. Titurius Sabinus (89 BCE), and an Augustan denarius issued by P. Petronius Turpilianus (c. 19 BCE). (See images above of "Denarius 89 BCE," "Denarius 18-19 BCE," and "Basilica Aemilia")

The Basilica Aemilia provides the most complex portrayal out of the three. The frieze depicts Tarpeia in the center, cornered by a soldier on each side of her preparing to overwhelm her with their shields. The two outer figures on each side are said to possibly be Titus Tatius and Mars Ultor, or alternatively Romulus himself.

The Sabinus Denarius closely resembles the Basilica Aemilia with an image of Tarpeia being surrounded by two Sabine soldiers with raised shields. The Turpilianus Denarius differs slightly from the prior two depictions. Tarpeia is the central and only figure on the reverse side of the coin. The shields have already been piled on top of her and her hands are lifted up in a stance which evokes surrender.

== Symbolism ==
A common metaphor used in ancient times was the association of water vessels and female sexuality. The female body is the container while the water inside represents her fertility. Since Tarpeia was a Vestal Virgin, it is very significant that she dropped her water vessel when first seeing Tatius in Propertius' account. Vestal Virgins were the embodiment of a perfect citizen of Rome. Their "unpenetrated skin" was a metaphor for Rome's walls remaining standing. The dropped water is interpreted as Tarpeia not being chaste, connecting her greed with "erotic transgression".

In Propertius’ version, the symbolism of water also occurs in Tarpeia’s dream where she sees herself as both an Amazon and Bacchante. The image of an Amazon refers to the river Thermodon in the mythical Amazon land in Pontus. The image of a Bacchante refers to the Strymon river in Thrace which is associated with Dionysius.

The myth of Tarpeia has been widely read as a cautionary tale about the evil of treachery, greed, and lust. Images of Tarpeia and the myth were later used during the Augustan age as exempla for the incorrect type of Roman woman and trickery. The Basilica Aemilia from the 1st century CE prominently features Tarpeia being overwhelmed by shields. The use of this image in the Augustan Age is tied to Augustan laws on sexual morality and his attempts to restore the empire. Therefore, the myth and image of Tarpeia was politically used to display the "wrong" kind of sexuality. Tarpeia is represented as the epitome of a traitorous Roman woman who betrayed her body to the state and was overcome by lust and greed. Additionally, the story of Tarpeia also points to the two-way loyalty that Sabine women had during this time in Roman history.

== See also ==
- Lucretia
- Al-Nadirah
- Debra May Macleod’s wrote historical fiction novel on Tarpeia.

== Sources ==
- Livy. "Ab urbe condita". Vol. 1, no. 11. Translated from the Original with Notes and Illustrations by George Baker, A.M.. First American ed., from the Last London Edition, in Six Volumes. New York: Peter A. Mesier et al., 1823.
- Propertius, IV.4
