= Eve Sussman =

British-American artist

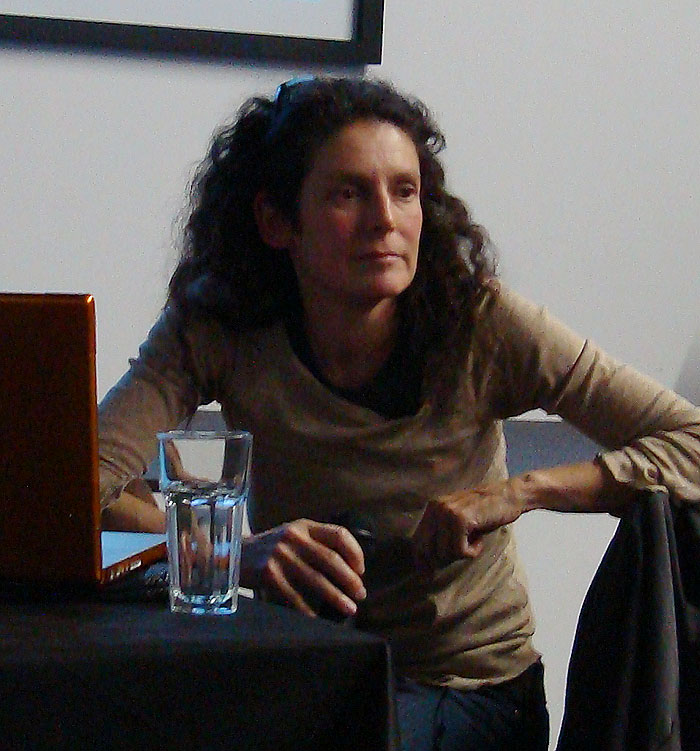
- Education: Robert College, University of Canterbury, Bennington College
- Movement: feminist art

Eve Sussman is a British-born American artist of film, video, installation, sculpture, and photography. She was educated at Robert College of Istanbul, University of Canterbury, and Bennington College. She resides in Brooklyn, New York, where her company, the Rufus Corporation, is based. She visits cultural centers around the world where her exhibitions take place.

== Work ==
Sussman's first solo show was at the Bronwyn Keenan Gallery in SoHo in 1997.

In 2003 Sussman began working in collaboration with The Rufus Corporation, an international ad hoc ensemble of performers, artists, and musicians. She produced the motion picture and video art pieces 89 Seconds at Alcázar (2004) and The Rape of the Sabine Women (2007). Sussman translates well known masterworks into her large scale re-enactments.

89 Seconds at Alcázar is a 10-minute, continuously flowing single take that meticulously creates the moments directly before and after the image portrayed by Diego Velázquez in Las Meninas (1656). It premiered at the 2004 Whitney Biennial.

Sussman's The Rape of the Sabine Women is a video-musical loosely based on the myth of the founding of Rome, inspired by the French neoclassical painter Jacques-Louis David's masterpiece, The Intervention of the Sabine Women (1794–1799). It was shot on location in Greece and Germany.

Sussman's 2011 film whiteonwhite:algorithmicnoir follows the observations and surveillance of a geophysicist software writer stuck in a futuristic city.

Yuri's Office, published in 2010, is a movie set built by Sussman in cooperation with The Rufus Corporation. The piece is a three-dimensional version of an original photograph taken by Sussman depicting the office of Yuri Gagarin.

Are The Birds Happy?, created in 2024 in collaboration with Simon Lee and Volkmar Klien, is a smartphone based, participatory performance. The performance is run on SADISS, an app that provides a means for guiding ad-hoc ensembles. Are The Birds Happy? was funded by a Hewlett Foundation 50 Arts Commission and premiered at Gray Area in San Francisco in 2024.

== Exhibitions ==
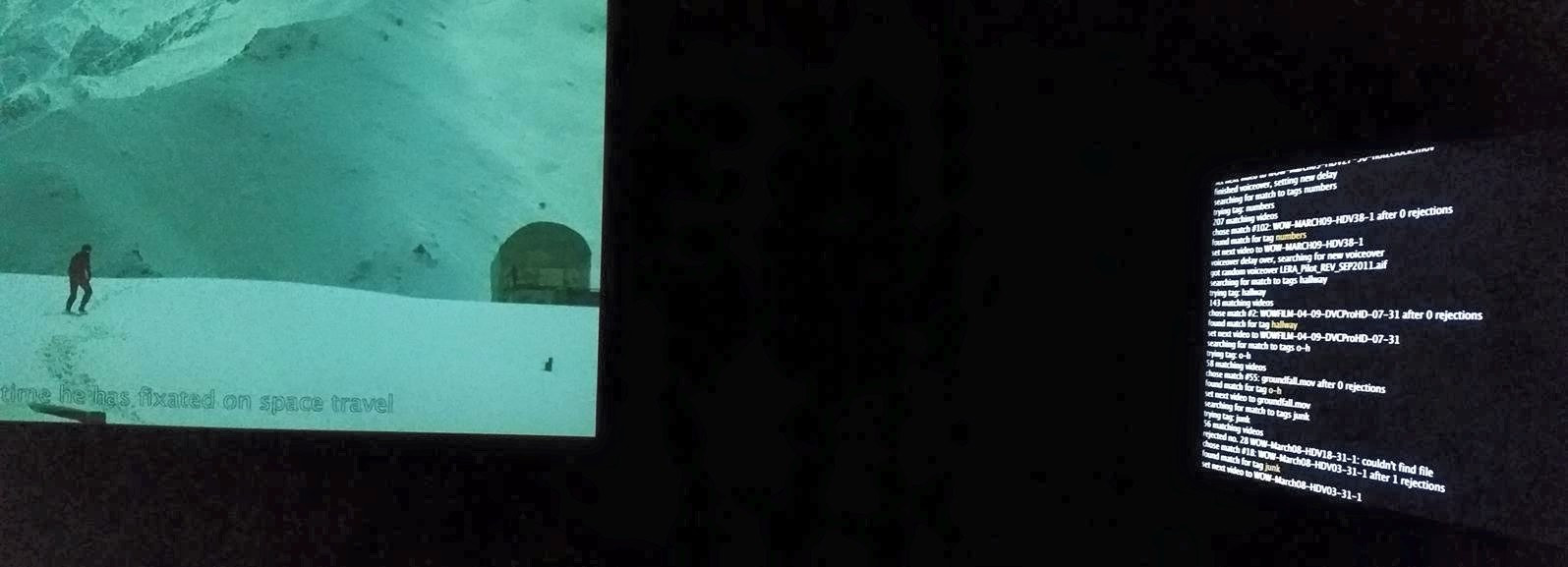
whiteonwhite:algorithmicnoir at the Smithsonian American Art Museum.

Sussman's work has been exhibited at the Whitney Museum of American Art and at institutions in Turkey, Austria, United Kingdom, Ireland, Germany, Italy, Spain, Croatia, France, Poland, and Canada.

whiteonwhite:algorithmicnoir and Yuri's Office were on display from April 24 - September 7, 2015 in the Smithsonian American Art Museum in Washington D.C., United States.

== See also ==
- Tableau vivant

== See also ==
- Inside the Artist's Studio, Princeton Architectural Press, 2015. (ISBN 978-1616893040)
