= Debra Macleod =

Canadian writer

- Born: Canada
- Education: B.A., J.D.
- Alma mater: Dalhousie University (J.D.), University of Alberta (B.A.)
- Occupations: Author, marital mediator
- Spouse: Don Macleod (m.2000)
- Writing career
- Language: English
- Genres: Fiction, non-Fiction
- Subjects: History, Relationships
- Website: debramacleod.com debramaymacleod.com

Debra Macleod also known as Debra May Macleod is a Canadian author, novelist and marital mediator. She is the founder of marriage coaching program Marriage SOS.

== History ==
Debra is a graduate of Dalhousie University law school and the University of Alberta. She underwent conflict resolution and mediation training at the ADR Institute of Alberta. Debra has worked as a marital mediator and media resource.

She has been featured as a contributor and expert in TV, radio, newspapers, magazine, and online media including The New York Times, Washington Post, USA Today, Los Angeles Times, Fox TV, Cosmopolitan, Men's Health, CBC TV, Daily Mail, and China Post.

Debra is the author of six historical fiction novels set in ancient Rome, centering on the Vestal Virgins.

Marriage SOS is designed as an alternative path to traditional couples therapy or psychological counseling. The program is an adapted style of shuttle mediation with a focus on insight and empathy into both sides of marital disagreements. This focus is designed to improve the overall dynamics in the partnership while simultaneously resolving specific areas of conflict and improving communication. There is also an emphasis on balancing emotional and sexual intimacy.

The program has seen success with both film and oil industry workers and executives.

== Bibliography ==
- The Vesta Shadows trilogy (Brides of Rome, To Be Wolves, Empire of Iron)
- The First Vestals of Rome trilogy (Rhea Silvia, Tarpeia, Amata)
- Marriage SOS: 30 Lifelines to Rescue Your Relationship in One Month (2014)
- Marriage SOS: Oilpatch Edition: How Oilpatch Couples Can Prevent Relationship Blow Out & Stay Together Even When Apart (2014)
- Couples in Crisis: Overcoming Affairs & Opposite-Sex Friendships: A Fast & Innovative Approach to Rebuild Trust & Revive Your Marriage (Not Talk It To Death) (2015)
- Stop Fighting to Get Along: Practical, Painless Ways to Improve Communication, Interactions & Conflict Resolution Skills in Marriage
