= Simylus =

Simylus, Simulus, or Simylos (Greek: Σιμύλος) may refer to:

- Simylus, Athenian comic poet of 4th century BC
- Simylus, Athenian tragic actor of 4th century BC
- Simylus of Neapolis, Olympic winner in stadion 248 BC
- Simylus, poor farmer in the poem Moretum traditionally ascribed to Virgil
