= The Rape of the Sabine Women (2006 film) =

- Screenplay by: Eve Sussman
- Based on: The Rape of the Sabine Women
- Produced by: Eve Sussman
- Release date: November 26, 2006 (International Thessaloniki Film Festival)

The Rape of the Sabine Women is an art film by Eve Sussman, which had its world premiere on 2006-11-26 at the 47th International Thessaloniki Film Festival.

Eve Sussman, an artist and movie producer, was born in England, to American parents, in 1961. She was educated at Robert College of Istanbul, University of Canterbury and Bennington College. Besides the United States, and the Whitney Museum of American Art amongst other institutions her work has been exhibited in Turkey, Austria, United Kingdom, Ireland, Germany, Italy, Spain, Croatia, France, Poland and Canada.

The dialogue free film revisits the eponymous classical story in a variety of modern contexts.

== See also ==
- Las Meninas
- Tableau vivant
