= Spurius Tarpeius =

Commander of the Roman citadel under King Romulus

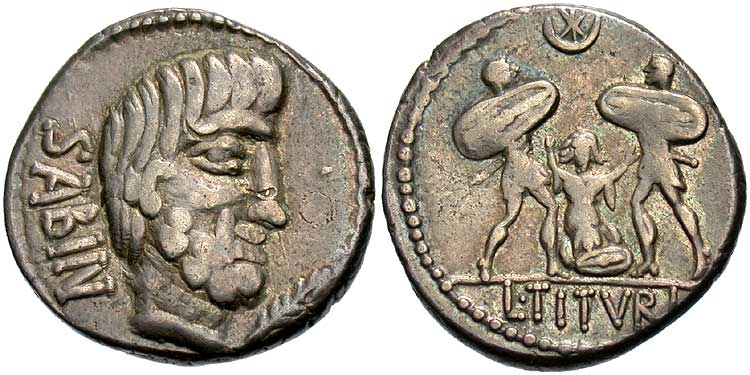

Spurius Tarpeius is a mythological/historical character. He was the commander of the Roman citadel under King Romulus. His daughter, Tarpeia, betrayed the city to the fathers of the kidnapped Sabine women and asked for everything the Sabine warriors had on their left arms: it is thought Sabine warriors had gold bracelets and rings on their left arms. However, they crushed her with the shields they had on their left arms instead.

== See also ==
- Rape of the Sabine Women

== Sources ==
- Livy. "Ab urbe condita". Vol. 1:11. Translated from the Original with Notes and Illustrations by George Baker, A.M.. First American ed., from the Last London Edition, in Six Volumes. New York: Peter A. Mesier et al., 1823.
- Sanders HA. The Myth about Tarpeia in Roman Historical Sources and Institutions Volume 1 of Studies: Humanistic series, University of Michigan. Macmillan, 1903. pages 1-47.
