= The Rape of the Sabine Women (Rubens) =

Painting by Peter Paul Rubens

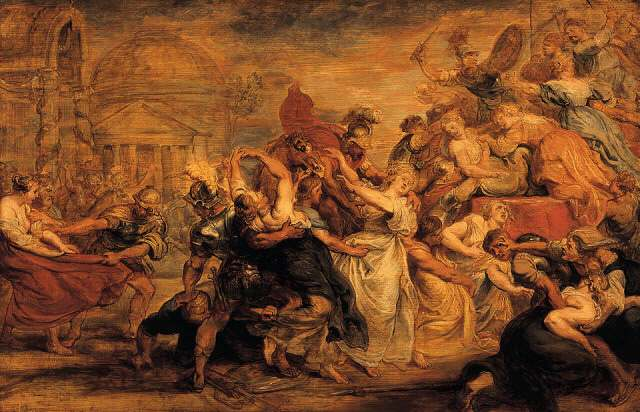
The Rape of the Sabine Women (1639–1640) by Rubens

The Rape of the Sabine Women is a painting by Peter Paul Rubens. It is now in the Belfius Collection. It was commissioned by Philip IV of Spain in 1639 but was still incomplete on Rubens' death a year later. It was completed by the Brussels painter Gaspar de Crayer.

Another version of this painting is now held by the National Gallery, London.

The painting depicts the Rape of the Sabine Women from the mythological and historical era of ancient Rome when it was ruled by the first king Romulus.

== Bibliography ==
- Palais des Beux-Arts de Lille (2004) RUBENS.
