= List of distinguished Roman women =

The list below includes Roman women who were notable for their family connections, or their sons or husbands, or their own actions. In the earlier periods, women came to the attention of (later) historians either as poisoners of their husbands (a very few cases), or as wives, daughters, and mothers of great men such as Scipio Africanus. In later periods, women exercised or tried to exercise political power either through their husbands (as did Fulvia and Livia Drusilla) or political intrigues (as did Clodia and Servilia), or directly (as did Agrippina the younger and later Roman empresses). Even the Severan dynasty from the beginning to the end was completely dominated by four powerful and calculating women.

== During the Roman Kingdom ==
Name	Image	Dates	Details
Rhea Silvia		c. 700s BC	A Vestal Virgin who got pregnant by Mars, she gave birth to the twins Romulus and Remus, who went on to found the city of Rome.
Hersilia		c. 700s BC	Wife of Romulus and following the abduction of the Sabine women, helped end the conflict between the Romans and Sabines.
Tarpeia		c. 700s BC	The daughter of the Roman commander Spurius Tarpeius. She was a Vestal Virgin who betrayed Rome to the Sabines at the time of their women's abduction.
Lucretia (Queen of Rome)		c. 700s–600s BC	The second wife of Roman King Titus Tatius.
Tanaquil		died c. 575 BC	Tanaquil came from a powerful Etruscan family and was Queen of Rome through her marriage to Lucius Tarquinius Priscus, Rome's fifth King.
Tarquinia		c. 600s–500s BC	Tarquinia was the daughter of Rome's fifth King, Lucius Tarquinius Priscus, and his wife Tanaquil.
Tullia Major		died c. 535 BC	First daughter of king Servius Tullius. She was assassinated by her husband and younger sister.
Tullia Minor		died after 509 BC	Second daughter of king Servius Tullius. She killed her husband, sister, and father, and became the last Queen of Rome. She and her family were exiled after Lucretia's suicide and the overthrow of the monarchy.
Lucretia		died c. 510 BC	Lucretia was a noblewoman whose rape and eventual suicide led to the overthrow of the Roman monarchy.

== During the Roman Republic ==
Name	Image	Dates	Details
Aemilia Tertia		с. 230 – 163 or 162 BC	Wife of Scipio Africanus and mother of Cornelia (see below), noted for the unusual freedom given her by her husband, her enjoyment of luxuries, and her influence as role model for elite Roman women after the Second Punic War. Her date of birth, marriage, and death are all unknown. Her husband's birth and death dates are also not known precisely, but approximated.
Busa (Apulian noblewoman)		3rd-century BC	Apulian noblewoman who received honors from the Senate.
Claudia (sister of Publius Claudius Pulcher)		3rd-century BC	First woman to be convicted of treason during the Roman Republic.
Cloelia		6th-century BC	Escaped capture by the Etruscan king Lars Porsena.
Clodia (wife of Metellus)		b. 95/94 BCE	An aristocratic woman attacked by Cicero in his speech Pro Caelio (56 BC). She was the sister of Cicero's enemy Publius Clodius Pulcher and is identified by some with the "Lesbia" of Catullus's poems.
Cornelia		c. 190s – c. 115 BC	Daughter of Publius Cornelius Scipio Africanus, the hero of the Second Punic War. She was the mother of the Gracchi brothers, and the mother-in-law of Scipio Aemilianus.
Fulvia		d. 40 BC	A woman married in turn to three prominent late republican politicians: Publius Clodius Pulcher (died 52 BC), Gaius Scribonius Curio (died 49 BC), and Mark Antony (consul 44 BC). She is famous for stabbing the tongue of Cicero's severed head in 43 BC with her golden hairpin.
Fulvia (mistress of Quintus Curius)		1st-century BC	Roman noblewoman who revealed the Catilinarian conspiracy to Cicero
Gaia Afrania		d. 48 BC	Known for pleading cases in court
Julia (daughter of Caesar)		c. 76 BC – August 54 BC	Daughter of Julius Caesar and fourth wife of Pompey the Great.
Minucia (Vestal virgin)		d. c. 337 BC	Vestal Virgin convicted of and executed for unchastity.
Orbinia (Vestal virgin)		d. 472 BC	Vestal virgin convicted and executed for unchastity.
Postumia (vestal)		5th-century BC	Vestal virgin accused of incestum
Publilia		1st century BC	The name of a woman of the gens Publilius. She was killed in 154 BC for poisoning her husband, the consul of the preceding year.
Quarta Hostilia		2nd-century BC	Roman noblewoman accused of poisoning her husband
Quinta Claudia		3rd-century BC	Said to have brought the cult of Cybele to Rome.
Servilia		100 BC – after 42 BC	The mother of Roman politician Brutus and a lover of Julius Caesar, whom her son would later assassinate.
Valeria		488 BC	First priestess of Fortuna Muliebris
Verginia		c. 465 BC – 449 BC	Supposedly murdered by her father following a threat to her virtue

== During the Roman Empire ==
Name	Image	Dates	Details
Aelia Domitia Paulina			Female relative of Emperor Hadrian.
Agrippina the Elder		c. 14 BC – AD 33	Wife of Germanicus, granddaughter of Augustus, mother of emperor Caligula and Agrippina the Younger.
Agrippina the Younger		1st century AD	Niece and wife of emperor Claudius, mother of emperor Nero; held up as a bad example.
Antonia the Elder		1st century BC	Gandmother of Emperor Nero.
Antonia Minor		1st century BC – 1st century AD	Mother of Emperor Claudius and Germanicus, favorite niece of Augustus Caesar, considered a role model for women in the Roman Empire after she refused to remarry and spent the rest of her life raising her children and grandchildren.
Atia		c. 85 – c. 43 BC	Mother of Augustus and Octavia Minor,
Aquilia Severa		d. after 222	Vestal Virgin and wife of Elagabalus.
Argentaria Polla		c. 1st Century AD	Patroness of Martial and Statius. She was also the wife of the Roman poet Lucan.
Aurelia		1st century BC	Mother of Julius Caesar
Claudia Marcella Major		b. before 40 BC	Niece of Caesar Augustus.
Claudia Metrodora		1st century AD	Greco-Roman public benefactor, lived on Kos.
Claudia Pulchra		14 BC – AD 26	Wife of Publius Quinctilius Varus
Clodia		1st century BC	Possibly Catullus's Lesbia
Domitia Decidiana		1st century AD	Wife of Roman General Gnaeus Julius Agricola and mother-in-law to historian Tacitus.
Domitia Lepida the Elder			Aunt of Emperor Nero
Domitia Lepida the Younger			Sister of the Domitia Longina; mother of the Empress Valeria Messalina
Domitia Longina		c. 50–55 – c. 126–130s AD	Wife of Emperor Domitian.
Domitia Calvilla			Mother of Emperor Marcus Aurelius.
Domitia Paulina			Female relative of Emperor Hadrian.
Galla Placidia		388–389 or 392–393 – 450	Daughter of the Roman emperor Theodosius I. Mother to emperor Valentinian III. She became queen consort to Ataulf, king of the Visigoths from 414 until his death in 415, and briefly empress consort to Constantius III in 421.
Plautia Urgulanilla		1st century AD	Emperor Claudius' first wife.
Procula		c. 1st Century AD	Wife of Pontius Pilate, the fifth governor of the Roman province of Judaea, who presided over the trial of Jesus and later ordered Jesus' crucifixion.
Pomponia Graecina		d. c. 83 AD	The wife of Aulus Plautius, the general who led the Roman conquest of Britain. She was speculated to have been an early Christian, and is a saint honoured by the Roman Catholic Church.
Julia Avita Mamaea		after 180 –235	Mother of Roman emperor Alexander Severus and remained one of his chief advisors throughout his reign. She was killed in 235 by rebel soldiers along with her son.
Julia Balbilla		72 – after 130 AD	Roman poet who toured Egypt with the Emperor Hadrian.
Julia Domna		160 – 217 AD	Wife of Septimius Severus and Mother of Caracalla and Geta.
Julia Livia		1st century	Granddaughter of Emperor Tiberius.
Julia Maesa		before 160 AD – c. 224 AD	Grandmother of Elagabalus and Alexander Severus. Best known for her plotting the restoration of the Severan dynasty to the Roman throne after the assassination of Caracalla and the usurpation of the throne by Macrinus.
Julia Serviana Paulina			Female relative of Emperor Hadrian.
Julia Soaemias		180 – 222 AD	Mother of emperor Elagabalus, she was her son's regent. After an uprising led by the Praetorian Guard, she entered the camp to protect her son, but was slain along with Elagabalus by the Praetorian Guard in 222.
Julia the Elder		39 BC – AD 14	Daughter of Augustus.
Livia Drusilla		1st century BC	Wife of Tiberius Claudius Nero, mother of the Emperor Tiberius, and then wife of Augustus Caesar.
Livilla		d. 31 AD	Granddaughter of Livia.
Lucilla		2nd century AD	Roman Empress, failed in her coup attempt on brother Commodus
Octavia the Younger		c. 69 – 11 BC	Sister of Caesar Augustus and fourth wife of Mark Antony
Scribonia		c. 70 BC – c. 16 AD	Second wife of Augustus and mother of his only legitimate child (whom she apparently ignored until her exile).
Ulpia Severina		c. 3rd Century AD	Wife of emperor Aurelian. After Aurelian's death, she briefly ruled the Roman Empire, until the new emperor, Marcus Claudius Tacitus was chosen by the Senate.
Valeria Messalina		c. 17/20–48	Emperor Claudius' wife, notorious for her promiscuity.
Vipsania Agrippina		d. 20 AD	First wife of Tiberius and the only one he loved.
Vibia Sabina		83–136/137 AD	Wife of Hadrian
Vipsania Julia		19 BC – c. AD 29	Granddaughter of Augustus

== See also ==
- Women in Ancient Rome
- List of Vestal Virgins
- List of archaeologically attested women from the ancient Mediterranean region
