= Urbinia gens =

Ancient Roman family

The gens Urbinia was an obscure plebeian family at ancient Rome. Only a few members of this gens are mentioned by Roman writers, but others are known from inscriptions.

== Origin ==
The nomen Urbinius belongs to a class of gentilicia originally formed from cognomina ending in -inus. The surname Urbinus probably referred to a native of Urbinum in Umbria.

== Members ==
- Urbinia, (Note: Some manuscripts give her name as Orbinia.) a vestal virgin buried alive for unchastity during the pestilence of 472 BC.
- Gaius Urbinius, quaestor in 74 BC, served under Quintus Caecilius Metellus Pius in Hispania Ulterior.
- Urbinius Panopion, (Note: Called "Appion" by Appian.) proscribed by the Second Triumvirate, was saved by one of his slaves, who exchanged clothes with him, and was slain in his place.
- Urbinia, a woman whose estate was contested by a certain Clusinius Figulus, who claimed to be her son, and retained the advocate Labienus to represent him against Urbinia's heirs, represented by Gaius Asinius Pollio. Quintilian describes a rhetorical trick of Asinius, who implied that Figulus' case was exceptionally weak by describing Labienus himself as the strongest point in the plaintiff's favour.
- Lucius Urbinius Quartinus, a native of Africa, was a soldier in the praetorian guard, where he served in the century of Faenius Justus. He was buried at Misenum in Campania, aged sixty, having served for twenty-five years, in a tomb built by Lucius Valerius Saturninus, dating from the second century, or the first half of the third.
- Marcus Urbinius Rufus, a native of Dacia, dedicated a tomb at Misenum, dating between the middle of the second century and the middle of the third, for his fellow-soldier, Cassius Albanus, a native of Corsica, aged thirty years, two months, and two days.
- Gaius Urbinius Victor, buried in a third-century tomb at Genua in Liguria.

=== Undated Urbinii ===
- Urbinius Micssi[...] buried at Ad Aquas Caesaris in Africa Proconsularis, aged eighty, along with Su[...]cia Rogata, aged thirty.
- Urbinius Sic[...], named in a pottery inscription from Germania Inferior.

== See also ==
- List of Roman gentes

== Bibliography ==
- Dionysius of Halicarnassus, Romaike Archaiologia (Roman Antiquities).
- Gaius Sallustius Crispus (Sallust), Historiae (The Histories).
- Valerius Maximus, Factorum ac Dictorum Memorabilium (Memorable Facts and Sayings).
- Marcus Fabius Quintilianus (Quintilian), Institutio Oratoria (Institutes of Oratory).
- Publius Cornelius Tacitus, Dialogus de Oratoribus (Dialogue on Oratory).
- Appianus Alexandrinus (Appian), Bellum Civile (The Civil War).
- Theodor Mommsen et alii, Corpus Inscriptionum Latinarum (The Body of Latin Inscriptions, abbreviated CIL), Berlin-Brandenburgische Akademie der Wissenschaften (1853–present).
- René Cagnat et alii, L'Année épigraphique (The Year in Epigraphy, abbreviated AE), Presses Universitaires de France (1888–present).
- George Davis Chase, "The Origin of Roman Praenomina", in Harvard Studies in Classical Philology, vol. VIII, pp. 103–184 (1897).
- Paul von Rohden, Elimar Klebs, & Hermann Dessau, Prosopographia Imperii Romani (The Prosopography of the Roman Empire, abbreviated PIR), Berlin (1898).
- T. Robert S. Broughton, The Magistrates of the Roman Republic, American Philological Association (1952–1986).
- Lothar Bakker and Brigitte Galsterer-Kröll, Graffiti auf römischer Keramik im Rheinischen Landesmuseum Bonn (Graffiti from Roman Pottery in the Bonn Rhineland Museum), Bonn (1975).
