= Postumia =

Postumia may refer to:

- Postumia (vestal), 5thC BC Vestal virgin
- Postumia gens, an ancient Roman family
- Postojna, Slovenia - Postumia in Italian
- Via Postumia, Roman road
