= Minucia (Vestal virgin) =

Roman priestess in 337 BC

Minucia was an ancient Roman Vestal Virgin, who—according to the 1st-century BCE historian LIvy—was convicted of unchastity ("incesto") around the year 337 BCE. Livy records that she was first suspected of having committed a crime on account of her elegant dress, which was more ornate than was proper ("mundiorem iusto cultum"). However, according to the classicist Robin Lorsch Wildfang, Livy reports that multiple other Vestal Virgins accused and convicted of the same crime—those being Postumia, Claudia, and Licinia, all of which were charged either because of overly-elaborate dress or for being too clever. Yet, no other sources corroborate these stories, leaving open the possibility that the actual crime of which these Vestal Virgins were accused was different. Orosius, a 4th-century Christian theologian, also records the death of Minucia. In his telling of her execution, she confessed to the crime, a detail which is not supported by Tacitus. In any case, Livy reports that she was accused before the pontiffs on the basis of the testimony of a slave and later convicted. Afterwards, she was then buried alive near the Colline gate, specifically to the right of the paved road in the "polluted field" ("Scelerato campo"), which Livy believes was named as such on account of the crime of Minucia.

Contemporary political issues may have motivated her execution, for she belonged to a powerful plebeian family, though they were formerly patrician. At the time, the Conflict of the Orders was ongoing and Roman politics was dominated by the struggle between the plebeian and patrician classes over political influence. In the years prior to Minucia's execution, plebeians had been successfully advancing up the Roman social ladder, thereby inserting themselves into areas of political life previously exclusive to patricians. For instance, the first plebeian consul, censor, and dictator had already held office, and the in the same year Minucia was put to death, the first plebeian praetor was elected. Minucia, being a plebeian Vestal Virgin, could have proven the ability of the plebeians to hold high religious offices, and thus she naturally would have been of importance in these ongoing political debates. It is possible that her execution, even if based on a crime she really committed, was partially motivated by a desire of the patrician class to suppress encroachments of the plebeian class into traditionally patrician areas of Roman society.
