= Junia Torquata =

Junia Torquata (Latin: Iunia C. Silani f. Torquata; before 10 BC – AD 55) was a Vestal Virgin of the gens Junia. She interceded on behalf of her brother, Gaius Junius Silanus, the consul of AD 10, after he was condemned for treason in AD 22.

== Sources ==
=== Primary ===
- Clauss, Manfred; Kolb, Anne; Slaby, Wolfgang A.; Woitas, Barbara (eds.). EDCS Epigraphik-Datenbank Clauss / Slaby. Katholische Universität Eichstätt-Ingolstadt. Universität Zürich.
  - "Recherche Nr. heute: 9286". Corpus Inscriptionum Latinarum 6. 2127.
  - "Recherche Nr. heute: 9306". Corpus Inscriptionum Latinarum 6. 2128.
- Jackson, John (1962). Tacitus II: Histories, Books IV–V; Annals, Books I–III. Cambridge, MA: Harvard University Press; London: William Heinemann Ltd. pp. 631–635.

=== Secondary ===
- Rüpke, Jörg; Glock, Anne (2008). Fasti Sacerdotum: A Prosopography of Pagan, Jewish, and Christian Religious Officials in the City of Rome, 300 BC to AD 499. Oxford: Oxford University Press. p. 175.
- Strothmann, Meret (2006). "Iunia (7)". In Cancik, Hubert; Schneider, Helmuth; Landfester, Manfred; Salazar, Christine F. (eds.). Brill's New Pauly: Encyclopaedia of the Ancient World. Brill Publishers.
