= Orbinia (Vestal virgin) =

- Born: ancient Rome
- Died: 472 BCE; Campus Sceleratus
- Cause of death: Premature burial
- Other name: Urbinia
- Years active: 5th-century BCE
- Era: Classical antiquity
- Known for: Executed for supposed unchastity
- Criminal charges: Unchastity
- Criminal penalty: Execution via live burial

Orbinia, alternatively rendered as Urbinia, was an ancient Roman Vestal virgin in 472 BCE who supposedly lost her virginity and yet continued to perform the sacred rites as required by her office. According to Dionysius of Halicarnassus, whilst she served as a Vestal Virgin, a disease began afflicting Roman women en masse, causing them to miscarry and die in childbirth. The augurs and pontiffs of Rome came to believe that the illness was caused by the improper completion of religious rites, and—while the pontiffs were searching for their culprit—they were informed by a slave that Orbinia was unchaste. Afterwards, the pontiffs removed her from office, put her on trial, and—after having convicted her—they decreed that she would be beaten with rods, led through the city as part of a procession, and then buried alive. Two men were identified as having supposedly had sex with her, of whom one committed suicide while the other was beaten in the forum like a slave and then put to death. Dionysius writes that, after the execution of Orbinia, the disease immediately stopped.

== See also ==
- Urbinia gens
