= Postumia (vestal) =

Roman vestal (5thC BC)

Postumia was a vestal virgin (Latin: sacerdos vestalis) of Rome accused of the crime of incestum in 420 BC and acquitted of the crime.

Other than Postumia's trial, little is known about her life. She was born in the Postumii family, who were Roman patricians and held high offices in the late 5th century BC. She may be the sister of another Postumia who married T. Quinctius. Historians are unsure of her age, her education, her life before the trial, or how she was treated after.

For a vestal of Rome, incestum was an especially serious crime, for maintaining chastity was a special tenet of a vessel’s 30-year term of her office. The purity of the vestals was associated with the state of Rome itself, whereby the loss of a vestal’s virginity signaled insecurity for Rome. In Postumia's case, her behavior aroused suspicion; thus, she was placed on trial for her alleged crime, was perhaps deferred, then acquitted. After the trial, the Pontifex Maximus scolded Postumia for her questionable behavior.

Postumia's trial is noted by Roman historian Livy in his writing Ab Urbe Condita and the Greek historian Plutarch's essay De Capienda ex Inimicis Utilitate in Moralia.

In Livy's version, Postumia is tried for a breach of her chastity after her clothes were deemed too extravagant and her manners are not fit for a vestal virgin. His version has her case deferred first. Afterward, the Pontifex Maximus scolded her and ordered her to wear clothes more fitting of a vestal. This comes after an account of how Caius Sempronius was put on trial and fined heavily after the public could not attack Aulus Sempronius, who they believed had caused an unfair election. Because of the placement of Postumia's story in this larger text, Postumia's trial can be seen as a parallel to Caius Sempronius' trial whereby she is guiltless of the crime but anger has been misdirected. The details Livy provides are problematic. For example, the use of the word ampliato is anachronistic, as this legal term does not exist in Postumia's time.

Plutarch's version of Postumia's story explains that she laughs too freely and is too bold with her jokes in front of men. He does not mention a deferment, but he names the Pontifex Maximus as Spurius Minucius. However, the name Plutarch provides for the Pontifex may be questionable. Plutarch’s reference to Postumia comes in a paragraph where he warns readers to be cautious of making unjust claims. He urges readers to question the source of rumors and adjust behaviors accordingly. Postumia is in a list of other historical figures who were unjustly accused of various faults due to misinterpreted behavior. Therefore, her story serves as a cautionary tale for women, particularly to vestals of the time period.

Postumia's acquittal was a good outcome, for if she had been found guilty, Postumia would have been executed by being buried alive or immurement in the Campus Sceleratus near the Colline Gate.

Postumia is sometimes associated with Minucia, Aemilia, Licinia, and Martia, who were Roman women charged and executed for incestum. She typically appears in discussions on vestal’s or Roman women's clothing expectations and artistic iconography, such as in Lindner and DiLuzio’s works. Her story is also mentioned in a discussion on law and women's rights.
