= Vestal Virgin =

Priestesses of the Roman goddess Vesta

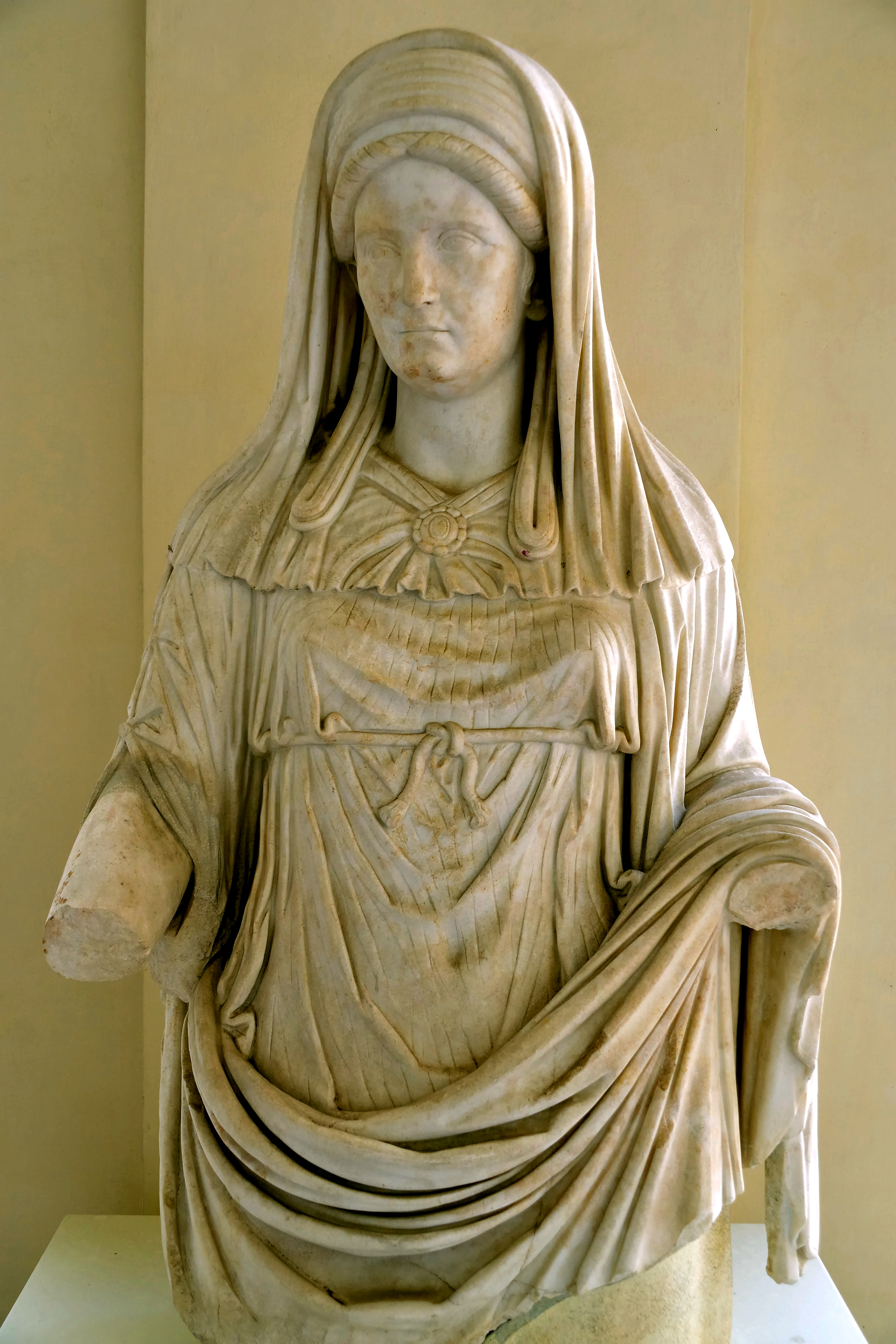
2nd-century AD Roman statue of a Virgo Vestalis Maxima (National Roman Museum)

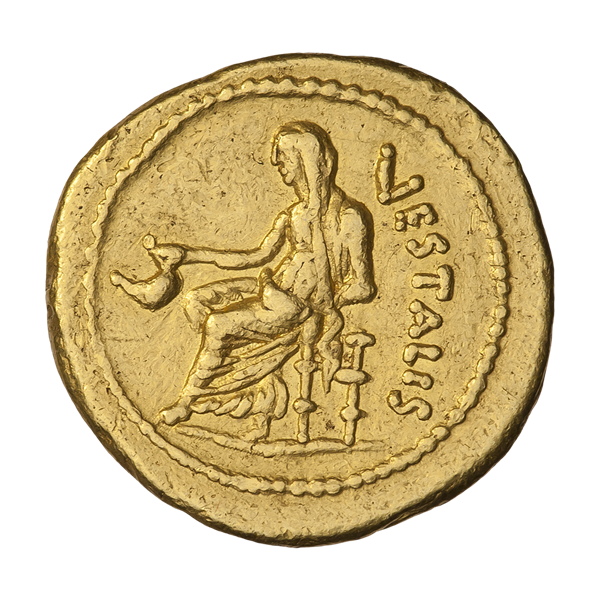
1st-century BC (43–39 BC) aureus depicting a seated Vestal Virgin marked vestalis

In ancient Rome, the Vestal Virgins or Vestals (Latin: Vestālēs, singular Vestālis [wɛsˈtaːlɪs]) were priestesses of Vesta, virgin goddess of Rome's sacred hearth and its flame.

The Vestals were unlike any other public priesthood. They were chosen before puberty from several suitable candidates, freed from any legal ties and obligations to their birth family, and enrolled in Vesta's priestly college of six members. They were supervised by a senior vestal but chosen and governed by Rome's leading male priest, the pontifex maximus—in the Imperial era, this meant the emperor.

Vesta's acolytes vowed to serve her for at least thirty years, study and practise her rites in service of the Roman State, and maintain their chastity throughout. In addition to their obligations on behalf of Rome, Vestals had extraordinary rights and privileges, some of which were granted to no others, male or female.

The Vestals took turns to supervise Vesta's sacred hearth so that at least one Vestal was stationed there at all times. Vestals who allowed the sacred fire to go out were punished with whipping. Vestals who lost their chastity were guilty of incestum and were sentenced to living burial, a bloodless death that was intended to seem voluntary. Their sexual partners, if known, were publicly beaten to death. These were infrequent events; most Vestals retired with a generous pension and universal respect. They were then free to marry, though few of them did. Some appear to have renewed their vows.

In 382 AD, the Christian emperor Gratian confiscated the public revenues assigned to the cult of Vesta in Rome. Soon after, the Vestals vanished from the historical record.

== History ==
Priesthoods with similar functions to the Vestals of Rome had an ancient and deeply embedded religious role in various surrounding Latin communities. According to Livy, the Vestals had pre-Roman origins at Alba Longa, where Rhea Silvia, a virgin daughter of the king, forced by her usurper uncle to become a Vestal, miraculously gave birth to twin boys, Romulus and Remus. The twins were fathered by Mars. They survived their uncle's attempts to kill them through exposure or drowning, and Romulus went on to found Rome. In the most widely accepted versions of Rome's beginnings, the city's legendary second king, Numa Pompilius, built its first Temple of Vesta, appointed its first pair of Vestals, and subsidised them as a collegiate priesthood. He then added a second pair. Rome's sixth king, Servius Tullius, who was also said to have been miraculously fathered by the fire god Vulcan or the household Lar with a captive Vestal, increased the number of Vestals to six. In the Imperial era as attested by Plutarch, the college had six Vestals at any given time. Claims by Ambrose and others that the college comprised seven Vestals in the late 4th century rest on "very unsatisfactory evidence".

The Vestals were a powerful and influential priesthood. Towards the end of the Republican era, when Sulla included the young Julius Caesar in his proscriptions, the Vestals interceded on Caesar's behalf and gained him pardon. Caesar's adopted heir Augustus promoted the Vestals' moral reputation and presence at public functions and restored several of their customary privileges that had fallen into abeyance. They were held in awe and attributed certain mysterious and supernatural powers and abilities. Pliny the Elder tacitly accepted these powers as fact:

At the present day, too, it is a general belief that our Vestal virgins have the power, by uttering a certain prayer, to arrest the flight of runaway slaves and to rivet them to the spot, provided they have not gone beyond the precincts of the City. If then these opinions be once received as truth, and if it be admitted that the gods do listen to certain prayers or are influenced by set forms of words, we are bound to conclude in the affirmative upon the whole question.

The 4th-century AD urban prefect Symmachus, who sought to maintain traditional Roman religion during the rise of Christianity, wrote:

The laws of our ancestors provided for the Vestal virgins and the ministers of the gods a moderate maintenance and just privileges. This gift was preserved inviolate till the time of the degenerate moneychangers, who diverted the maintenance of sacred chastity into a fund for the payment of base porters. A public famine ensued on this act, and a bad harvest disappointed the hopes of all the provinces [...] it was sacrilege which rendered the year barren, for it was necessary that all should lose that which they had denied to religion.

Dissolution of the Vestal College would have followed soon after the emperor Gratian confiscated its revenues in 382 AD. The last epigraphically attested Vestal is Coelia Concordia, a Virgo Vestalis Maxima who in 385 AD erected a statue to the deceased pontiff Vettius Agorius Praetextatus. Zosimos claims that when Theodosius I visited Rome in 394 AD, his niece Serena insulted an aged Vestal, said to be the last of her kind. It is unclear from Zosimos's narrative whether Vesta's cult was still functioning, maintained by that single Vestal, or moribund. Cameron is skeptical of the entire tale, noting that Theodosius did not visit Rome in 394.

== Term of service ==
The Vestals were committed to the priesthood before puberty (when 6–10 years old) and sworn to celibacy for a minimum period of 30 years. A thirty-year commitment was divided into three decade-long periods during which Vestals were students, servants, and teachers, respectively. Vestals typically retired with a state pension in their late 30s to early 40s and thereafter were free to marry. The pontifex maximus, acting as the father of the bride, might arrange a marriage with a suitable Roman nobleman on behalf of the retired Vestal, but no literary accounts of such marriages have survived. Plutarch repeats a claim that "few have welcomed the indulgence, and that those who did so were not happy, but were a prey to repentance and dejection for the rest of their lives, thereby inspiring the rest with superstitious fears, so that until old age and death they remained steadfast in their virginity". Some Vestals preferred to renew their vows. Occia was vestal for 57 years between 38 BC and 19 AD.

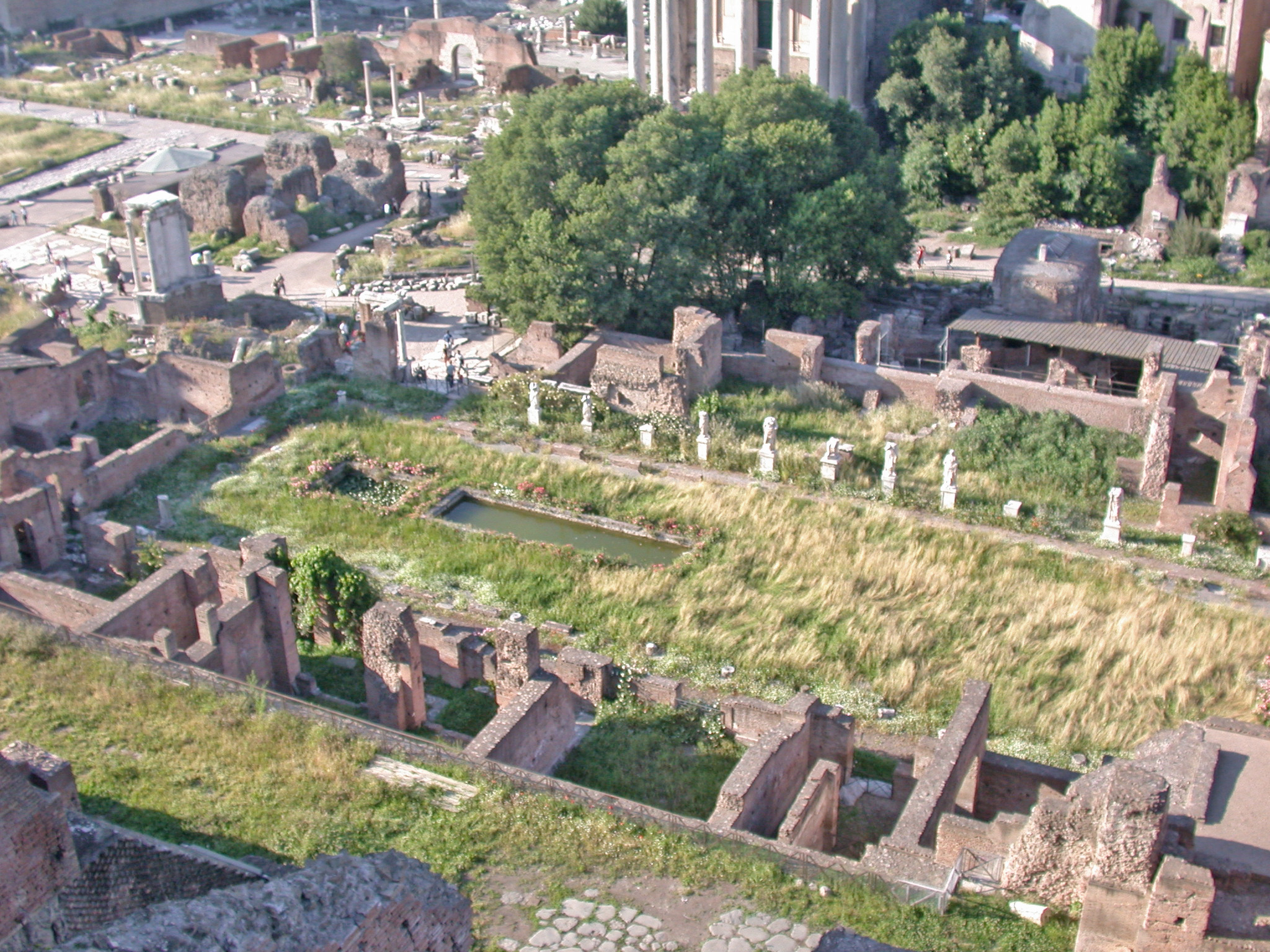
House of the Vestals and Temple of Vesta from the Palatine

=== Selection ===
To obtain entry into the order, a girl had to be free of physical, moral, and mental 'defects'; have two living parents; and be a daughter of a free-born resident of Rome. From at least the mid-Republican era, the pontifex maximus chose Vestals by lot from a group of twenty high-born candidates at a gathering of their families and other Roman citizens.

Under the Papian Law of the 3rd century BC, candidates for Vestal priesthoods had to be of patrician birth. Membership was opened to plebeians as it became difficult to find patricians willing to commit their daughters to 30 years as a Vestal, and then ultimately even from the daughters of freemen for the same reason.

The choosing ceremony was known as a captio (capture). Once a girl was chosen to be a Vestal, the pontifex pointed to her and led her away from her parents with the words, "I take you, amata (beloved), to be a Vestal priestess, who will carry out sacred rites, which it is the law for a Vestal priestess to perform, on behalf of the Roman people, on the same terms as her who was a Vestal 'on the best terms'" (thus, with all the entitlements of a Vestal). As soon as she entered the atrium of Vesta's temple, she was under the goddess' service and protection.

If a Vestal died before her contracted term ended, potential replacements would be presented in the quarters of the chief Vestal to select the most virtuous. Unlike normal inductees, these candidates did not have to be prepubescent, nor even virgins; they could be young widows or even divorcées, though that was frowned upon and thought unlucky. Tacitus recounts how Gaius Fonteius Agrippa and Domitius Pollio offered their daughters as Vestal candidates in 19 AD to fill such a vacant position. Equally matched, Pollio's daughter was chosen only because Agrippa had been recently divorced. The pontifex maximus (Tiberius) "consoled" the failed candidate with a dowry of 1 million sesterces.

=== Vestalis Maxima ===
The chief Vestal (Virgo Vestalis Maxima or Vestalium Maxima, "greatest of the Vestals") oversaw the work and morals of the Vestals and was a member of the College of Pontiffs. The chief Vestal was probably the most influential and independent of Rome's high priestesses, committed to maintaining several different cults, maintaining personal connections to her birth family, and cultivating the society of her equals among the Roman elite. The Vestalis Maxima Occia presided over the Vestals for 57 years, according to Tacitus. The Flaminica Dialis and the regina sacrorum also held unique responsibility for certain religious rites, but each held office by virtue of their standing as the spouse of a male priest.

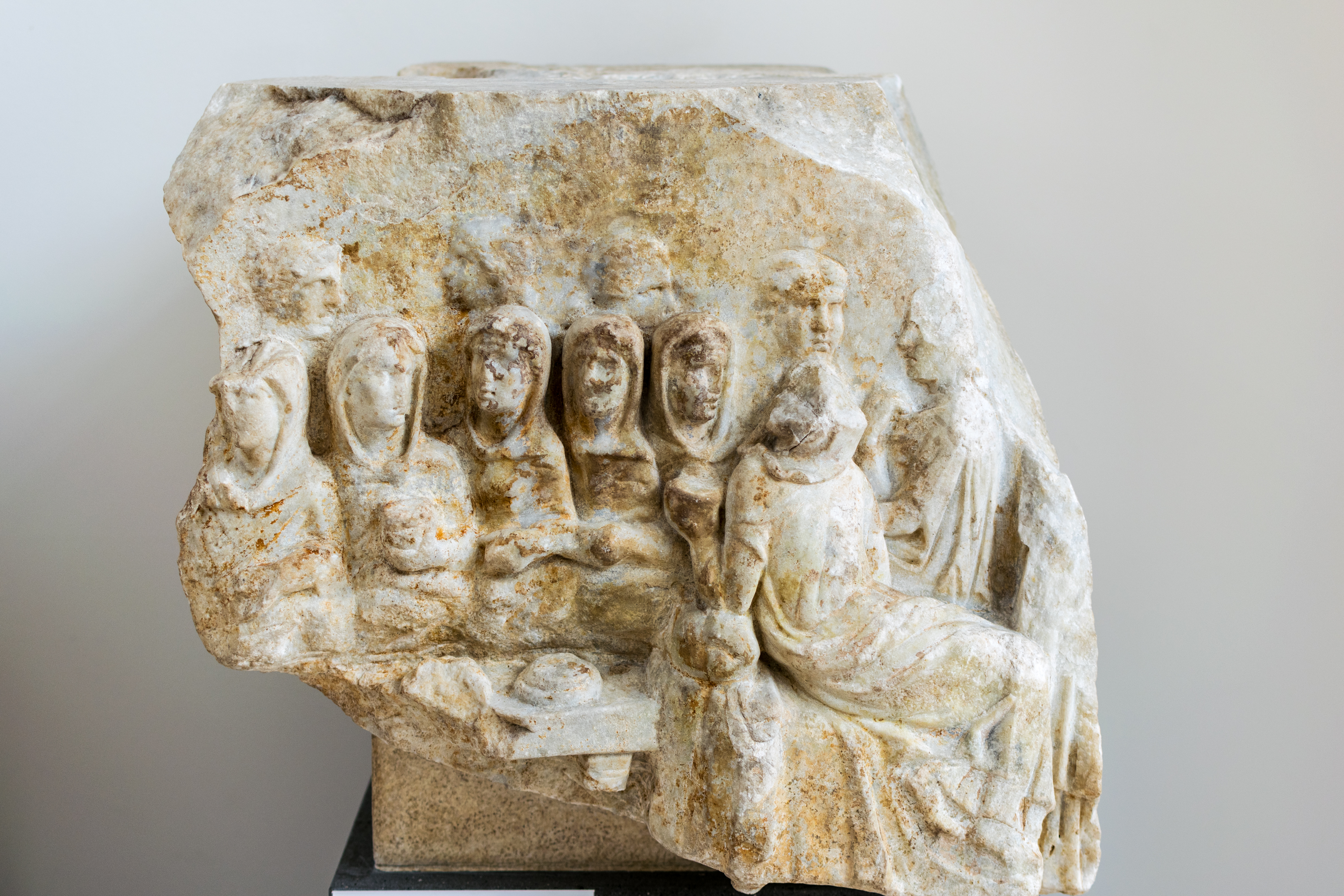
Relief of the Vestal Virgins at a banquet, found in 1935 near Rome's Via del Corso (Museum of the Ara Pacis)

=== Duties and festivals ===
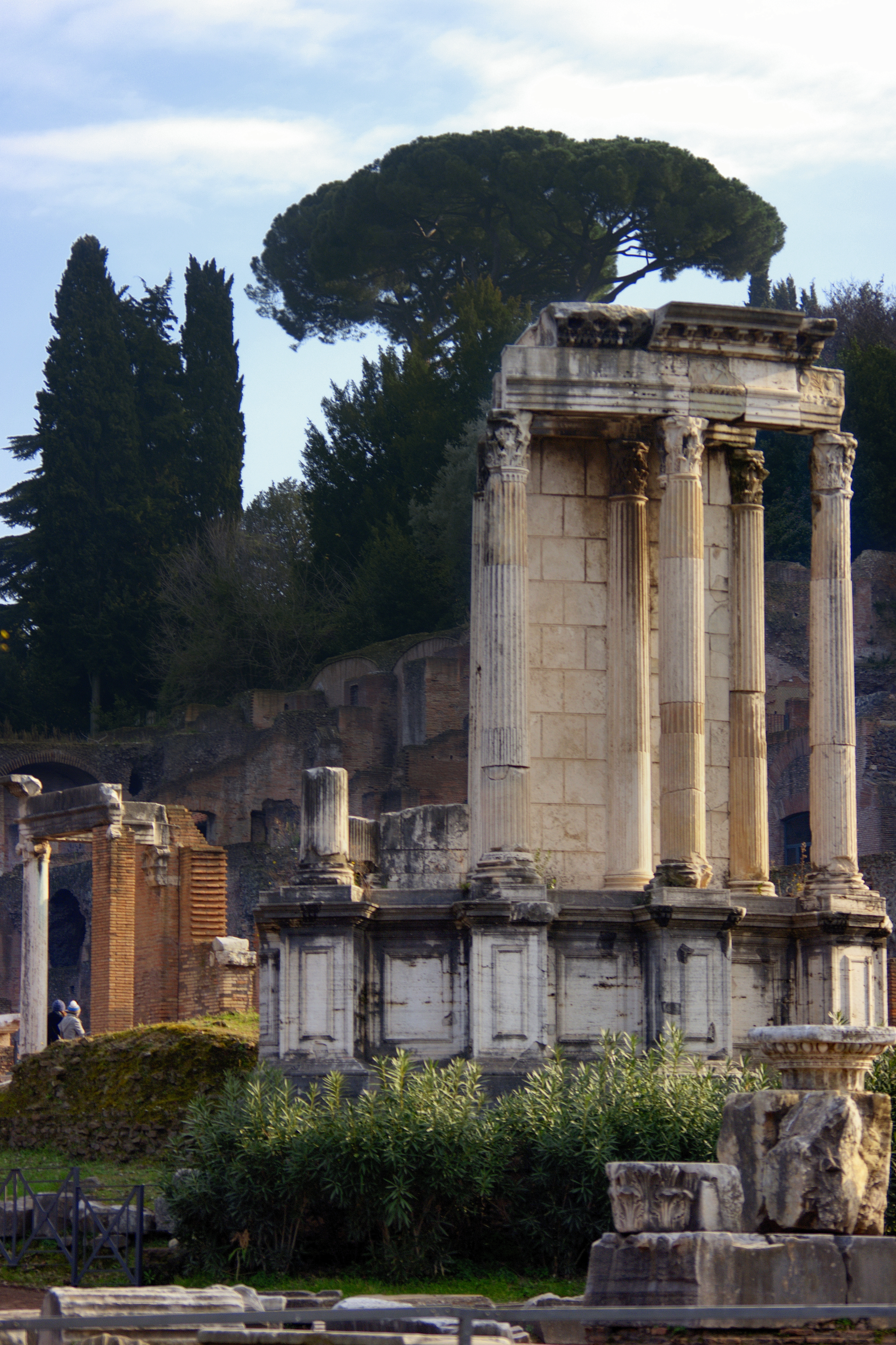
The most prominent feature of the ruins that were once the Temple of Vesta is the hearth (seen here in the foreground).

Vestal tasks included the maintenance of their chastity, tending Vesta's sacred fire, guarding her sacred shrine and its contents; collecting ritually pure water from a sacred spring; preparing substances used in public rites, presiding at the Vestalia and attending other festivals. Vesta's temple was essentially the temple of all Rome and its citizens; it was open all day; by night it was closed to men. The Vestals regularly swept and cleansed Vesta's shrine, functioning as surrogate housekeepers, in a religious sense, for all of Rome, and maintaining and controlling the connections between Rome's public and private religion. So long as their bodies remained unpenetrated, the walls of Rome would remain intact. Their flesh belonged to Rome, and when they died, whatever the cause of their death, their bodies remained within the city's boundary.

The Vestals acknowledged one of their number as senior authority, the Vestalis Maxima, but all were ultimately under the authority of the pontifex maximus, head of his priestly college. His influence and status grew during the Republican era, and the religious post became an important, lifetime adjunct to the political power of the annually elected consulship. When Augustus became pontifex maximus, and thus supervisor of all religion, he donated his house to the Vestals. Their sacred fire became his household fire, and his domestic gods (Lares and Penates) became their responsibility. This arrangement between Vestals and Emperor persisted throughout the Imperial era.

The Vestals guarded various sacred objects kept in Vesta's shrine, including the Palladium – a statue of Pallas Athene which had supposedly been brought from Troy – and a large, presumably wooden phallus, used in fertility rites and at least one triumphal procession, perhaps slung beneath the triumphal general's chariot.

==== Festivals ====
Vesta's chief festival was the Vestalia, held in her temple from June 7 to June 15, and attended by matrons and bakers. Servius claims that during the Vestalia, the Lupercalia and on September 13, the three youngest Vestals reaped unripened far (spelt wheat, or possibly emmer wheat). The three senior Vestals parched the grain to make it edible, and mixed it with salt, to make the mola salsa used by priests and priestesses to consecrate (dedicate to the gods) the animal victims offered in public sacrifices. The Vestals' activities thus provided a shared link to various public, and possibly some private cults.

The Fordicidia was a characteristically rustic, agricultural festival, in which a pregnant cow was sacrificed to the Earth-goddess Tellus, and its unborn calf was reduced to ashes by the senior Vestal. The ashes were mixed with various substances, most notably the dried blood of the previous year's October horse, sacrificed to Mars. The mixture was called suffimen. During the Parilia festival, April 21, it was sprinkled on bonfires to purify shepherds and their flocks, and probably to ensure human and animal fertility in the Roman community. On May 1, Vestals officiated at Bona Dea's public-private, women-only rites at her Aventine temple. They were also present, in some capacity, at the Bona Dea's overnight, women-only December festival, hosted by the wife of Rome's senior magistrate; the magistrate himself was supposed to stay elsewhere for the occasion. On May 15, Vestals and pontiffs collected ritual straw figures called Argei from stations along Rome's city boundary and cast them into the Tiber, to purify the city.

=== Privileges ===
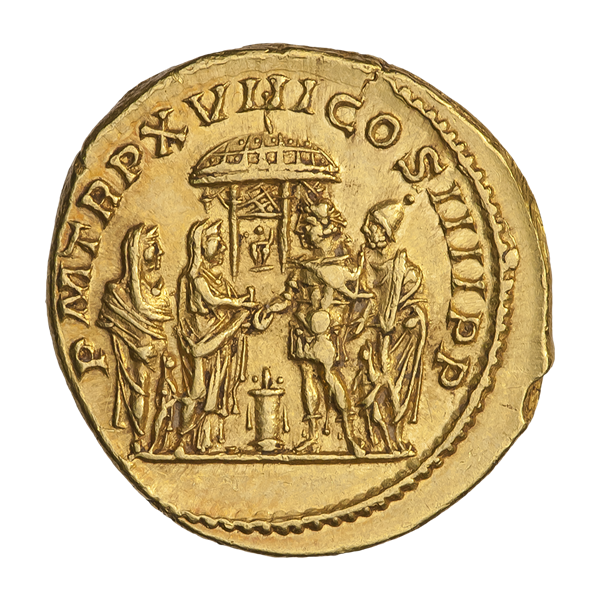
Reverse of an aureus depicting the emperor Caracalla and Vestals before the Temple of Vesta (early 3rd century)

Vestals were lawfully personae sui iuris – "sovereign over themselves", answerable only to the pontifex maximus. (Note: This might reflect his authority as paterfamilias over the life and death of Vestals as "daughters of Rome", though this is inconsistent with their legal independence from their birth family's control.) Unlike any other Roman women, they could make a will of their own volition, and dispose of their property without the sanction of a male guardian. They could give their property to women, something forbidden even to men, under Roman law. As they embodied the Roman state, Vestals could give evidence in trials without first taking the customary oath to the State. They had custody of important wills and state documents. Their person was sacrosanct; anyone who assaulted a Vestal was (in effect) assaulting an embodiment of Rome and its gods, and could be killed with impunity. As no magistrate held power over the Vestals, the lictors of magistrates who encountered a Vestal had to lower their fasces in deference.

The Vestals had unique, exclusive rights to use a carpentum, an enclosed, two-wheeled, horse-drawn carriage; some Roman sources remark on its likeness to the chariots used by Roman generals in triumphs. Otherwise, the Vestals seem to have travelled in a one-seat, curtained litter, or possibly on foot. In every case, they were preceded by a lictor, who was empowered to enforce the Vestal's right-of-way; anyone who passed beneath the litter, or otherwise interfered with its passage, could be lawfully killed on the spot.

Vestals could also free or pardon condemned persons en route to execution by touching them, or merely being seen by them, as long as the encounter had not been pre-arranged.

Vestals were permitted to see things forbidden to all other upper-class Roman women; from the time of Augustus on, they had reserved ring-side seating at public games, including gladiator contests, and stage-side seats at theatrical performances.

=== Prosecutions and punishments ===
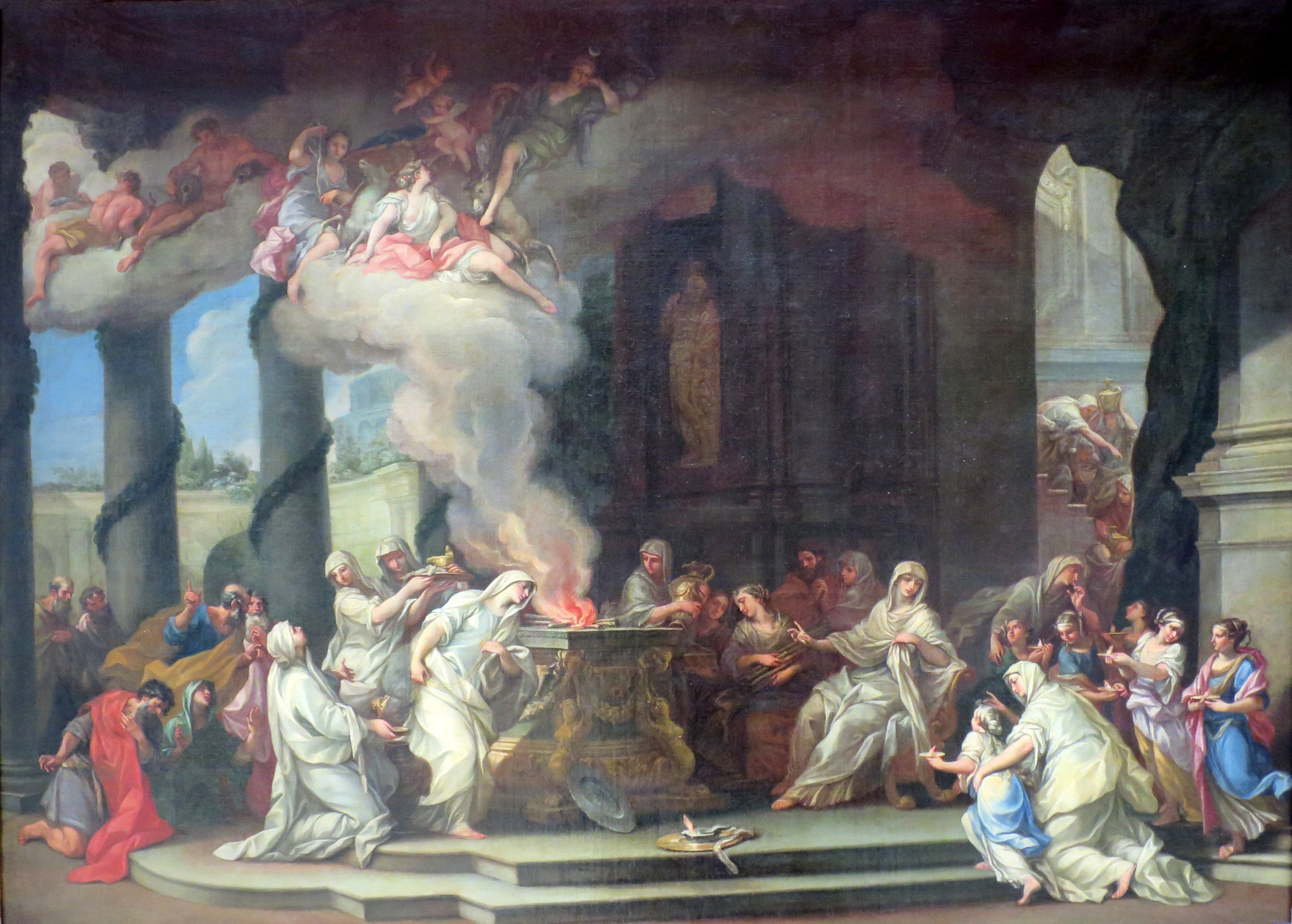
Early 18th-century depiction of the dedication of a Vestal, by Alessandro Marchesini

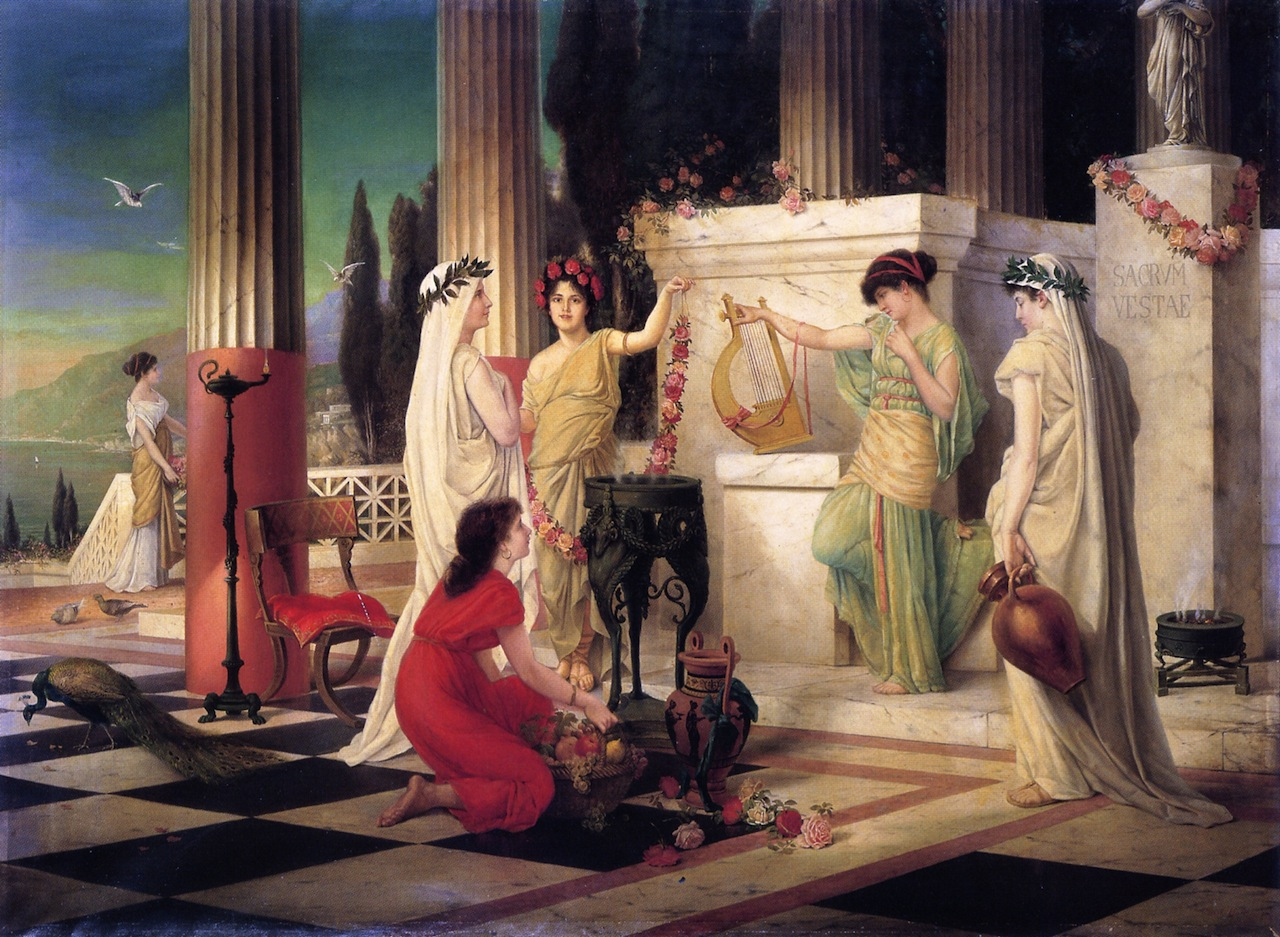
In the Temple of Vesta by Constantin Hölscher, 1902)

If Vesta's fire went out, Rome was no longer protected. Spontaneous extinction of the sacred flame for no apparent reason might be understood as a prodigy, a warning that the pax deorum ("peace of the gods") was disrupted by some undetected impropriety, unnatural phenomenon or religious offence. Romans had a duty to report any suspected prodigies to the Senate, who in turn consulted the pontifex maximus, the pontifices and the haruspices to determine whether the matter must be tried or dismissed. Expiation of prodigies usually involved a special sacrifice (piaculum) and the destruction of the "unnatural" object that had caused divine offence.

Extinction of Vesta's sacred fire through Vestal negligence could be expiated by the scourging or beating of the offender, carried out "in the dark and through a curtain to preserve their modesty". The sacred fire could then be relit, using the correct rituals and the purest materials. Loss of chastity, however, represented a broken oath. It was permanent, irreversible; no piaculum or expiation could restore it or compensate for its loss.

A Vestal who committed incestum breached Rome's contract with the gods; she became a contradiction, a visible religious embarrassment. By ancient tradition, she must die, but she must seem to do so willingly, and her blood could not be spilled. The city could not seem responsible for her death, and burial of the dead was anyway forbidden within the city's ritual boundary, so she was immured alive in an underground chamber within the city's ritual boundary (pomerium) in the Campus Sceleratus ("Evil Field") near the Colline Gate. That Vesta did not intervene to save her former protege was taken as further divine confirmation of guilt.

When condemned by the college of pontifices, [the Vestal] was stripped of her vittae and other badges of office, was scourged, was attired like a corpse, placed in a close litter, and borne through the forum attended by her weeping kindred, with all the ceremonies of a real funeral, to a rising ground called the Campus Sceleratus just within the city walls, close to the Colline gate. There a small vault underground had been previously prepared, containing a couch, a lamp, and a table with a little food. The pontifex maximus, having lifted up his hands to heaven and uttered a secret prayer, opened the litter, led forth the culprit, and placing her on the steps of the ladder which gave access to the subterranean cell, delivered her over to the common executioner and his assistants, who conducted her down, drew up the ladder, and having filled the pit with earth until the surface was level with the surrounding ground, left her to perish deprived of all the tributes of respect usually paid to the spirits of the departed.

If discovered, the paramour of a guilty Vestal was publicly beaten to death by the pontifex maximus, in the Forum Boarium or on the Comitium.

Trials for Vestal incestum were "extremely rare"; most took place during military or religious crises. Some Vestals were probably used as scapegoats; their political alliances and alleged failure to observe oaths and duties were held to account for civil disturbances, wars, famines, plagues and other signs of divine displeasure. The end of the Roman monarchy and the beginnings of the Republic involved extreme social tensions between Rome and her neighbours, and competition for power and influence between Rome's aristocrats and the commoner majority. In 483 BC, during a period of social conflict between patricians and plebeians, the Vestal Oppia, perhaps the earliest of several historic Vestals of plebeian family, was executed for incestum merely on the basis of various portents, and allegations that she neglected her Vestal duties. In 337 BC, Minucia, another possible first plebeian Vestal, was tried, found guilty of unchastity and buried alive on the strength of her excessive and inappropriate love of dress, and the evidence of a slave.

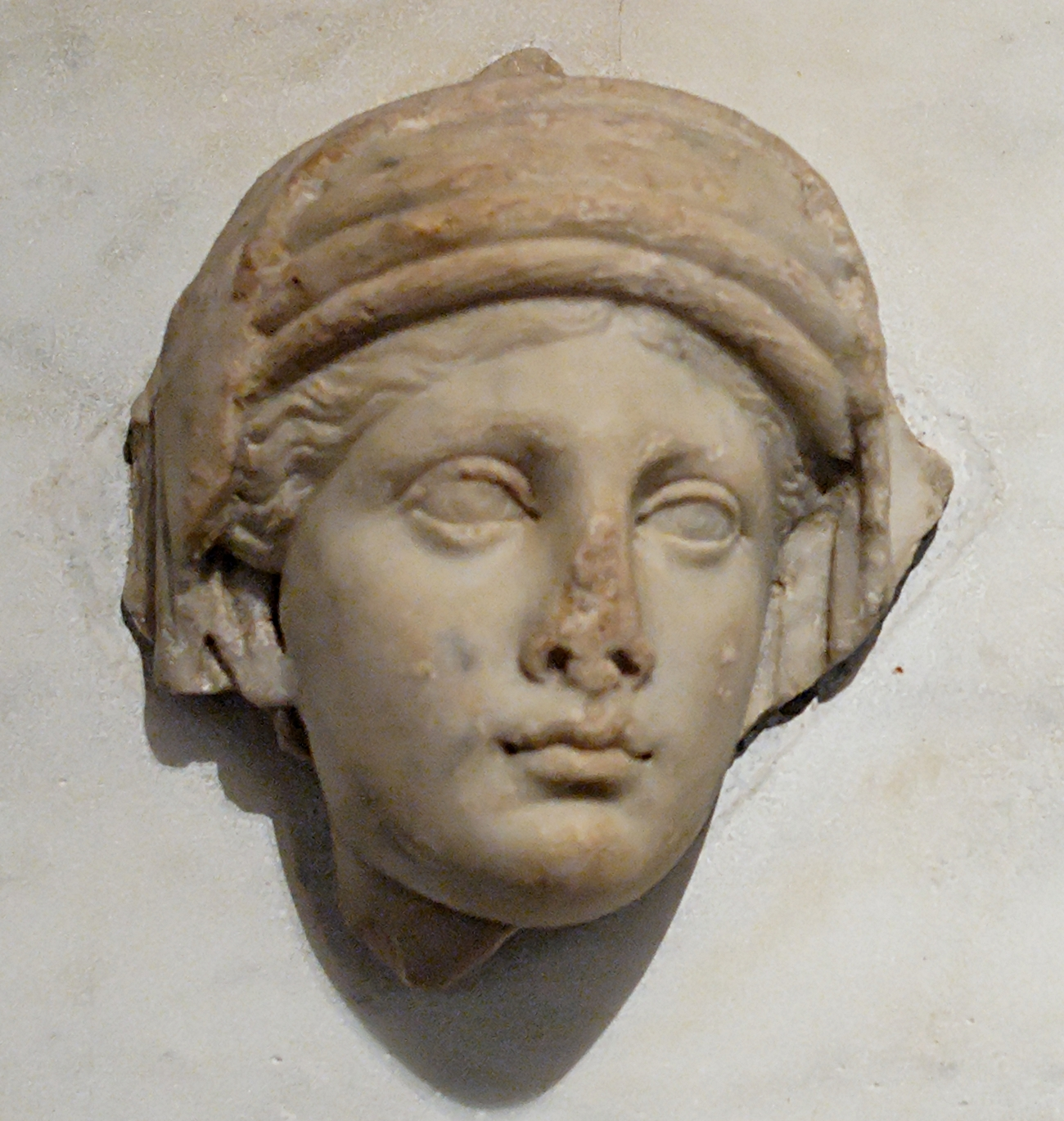
Vestal from the time of Hadrian, fragment of a relief found on the Palatine Hill (British Museum)

In 123 BC the gift of an altar, shrine and couch to the Bona Dea's Aventine temple by the Vestal Licinia "without the people's approval" was refused by the Roman Senate. In 114 Licinia and two of her colleagues, Vestals Aemilia and Marcia, were accused of multiple acts of incestum. The final accusations were justified by the death, in 114 BC, of Helvia, a virgin girl of equestrian family, killed by lightning while on horseback. The manner of her death was interpreted as a prodigy, proof of inchastity by the three accused. Aemilia, who had supposedly incited the two others to follow her example, was condemned outright and put to death. Marcia, who was accused of only one offence, and Licinia, who was accused of many, were at first acquitted by the pontifices, but were retried by Lucius Cassius Longinus Ravilla (consul 127), and condemned to death in 113. The prosecution offered two Sibylline prophecies in support of the final verdicts. Of the three Vestals executed for incestum between the first Punic War (216) and the end of the Republic (113–111), each was followed by a nameless, bloodless form of human sacrifice seemingly reserved for times of extreme crisis, supposedly at the recommendation of the Sibylline Books; the living burial or immurement in the Forum Boarium of a Greek man and woman, and a Gaulish man and woman, possibly to avert divine outrage at the ritual killing of the Vestal priestesses involved. According to Erdkamp, this may have also been intended to restore divine support for Rome's success on the battlefield, evidenced by later successful auguries. The initial charges against the Vestals concerned were almost certainly trumped up, and may have been politically motivated.

Pliny the Younger believed that Cornelia, a Virgo Maxima buried alive on the orders of emperor Domitian, may have been an innocent victim. He describes how she sought to keep her dignity intact when she descended into the chamber:

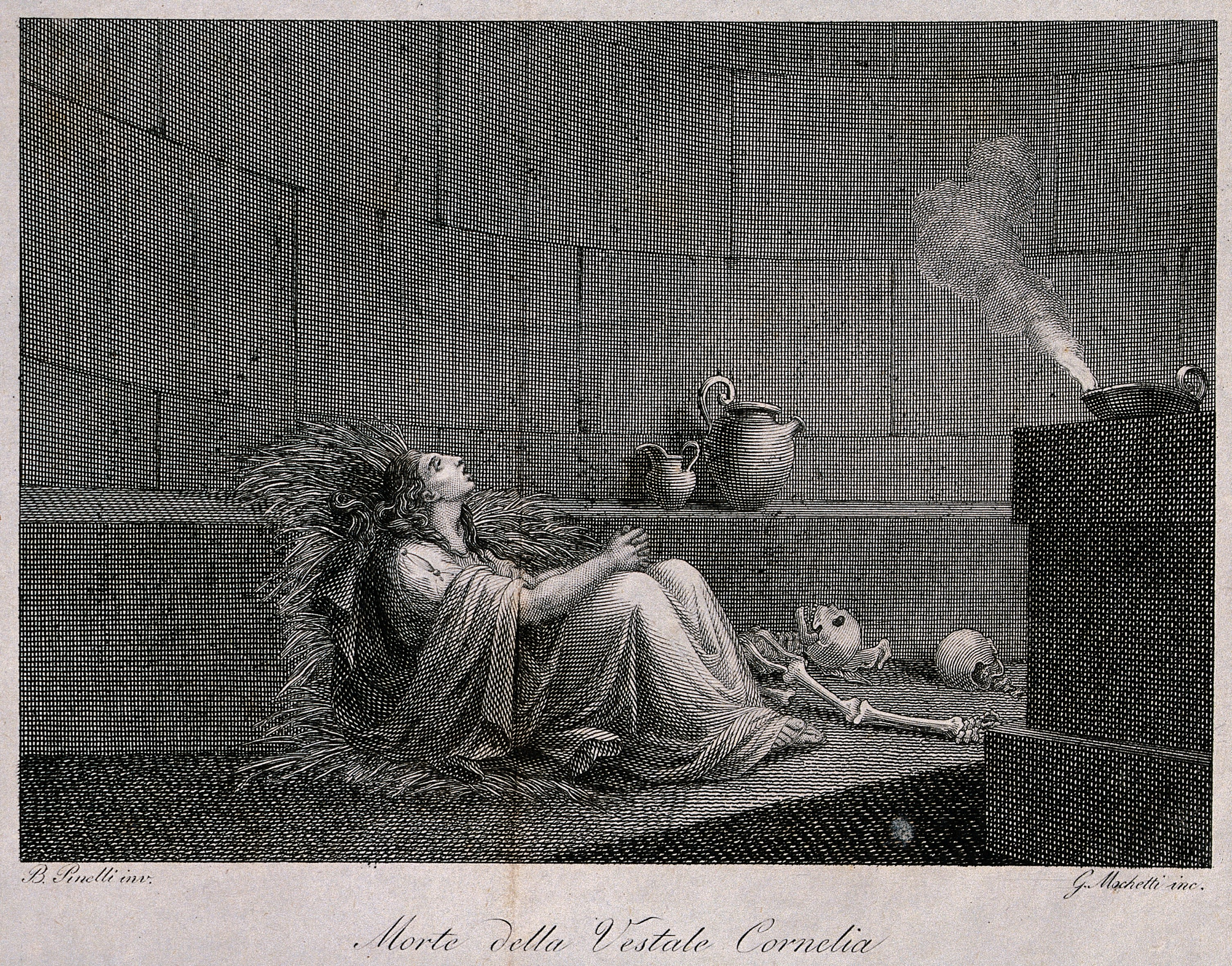
Cornelia entombed alive

As they were leading her to the place of execution, she called upon Vesta, and the rest of the gods, to attest her innocence; and, amongst other exclamations, frequently cried out, "Is it possible that Cæsar can think me polluted, under the influence of whose sacred functions he has conquered and triumphed?" Whether she said this in flattery or derision; whether it proceeded from a consciousness of her innocence or contempt of the emperor, is uncertain; but she continued exclaiming in this manner, til she came to the place of execution, to which she was led, whether innocent or guilty I cannot say, at all events with every appearance and demonstration of innocence. As she was being lowered down into the subterranean vault, her robe happening to catch upon something in the descent, she turned round and disengaged it, when, the executioner offering his assistance, she drew herself back with horror, refusing to be so much as touched by him, as though it were a defilement to her pure and unspotted chastity: still preserving the appearance of sanctity up to the last moment; and, among all the other instances of her modesty, "She took great care to fall with decency." [The quotation is from Euripides, Hecuba.]

Dionysius of Halicarnassus claims that long before Rome's foundation, Vestals at ancient Alba Longa were whipped and "put to death" for breaking their vows of celibacy, and that their offspring were to be thrown into the river. According to Livy, Rhea Silvia, mother of Romulus and Remus, had been forced to become a Vestal Virgin, and was chained and imprisoned when she gave birth. Dionysius also writes that the Roman king Tarquinius Priscus instituted live burial as a punishment for Vestal unchastity, and inflicted it on the Vestal Pinaria; and that whipping with rods sometimes preceded the immuration, and that this was done to Urbinia in 471 BC, in a time of pestilence and plebeian unrest.

Postumia, though innocent according to Livy, was suspected and tried for unchastity on grounds of her immodest attire and over-familiar manner. Some Vestals were acquitted. Some cleared themselves through ordeals or miraculous deeds; in a celebrated case during the mid-Republic, the Vestal Tuccia, accused of unchastity, carried water in a sieve to prove her innocence; Livy's epitomator (Per. 20) claims that she was condemned nevertheless but in all other sources she was acquitted.

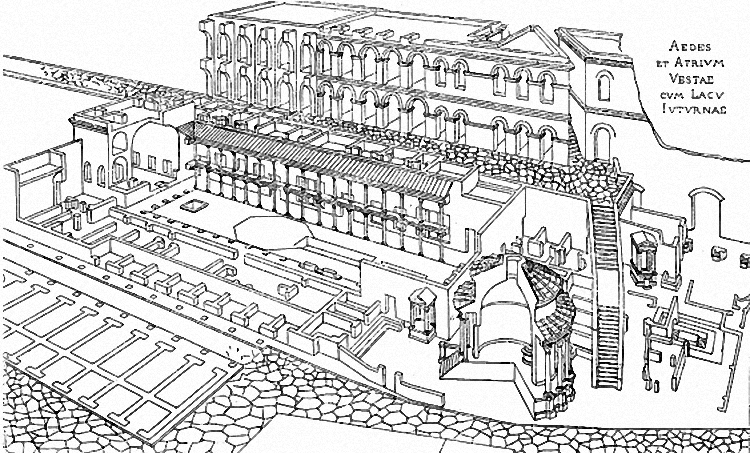
A reconstruction of the House of the Vestals by Christian Hülsen (1905)

== House of the Vestals ==
The House of the Vestals was the residence of the vestal priestesses in Rome. Located behind the Temple of Vesta (which housed the sacred fire), the Atrium Vestae was a three-storey building at the foot of the Palatine Hill, "very large and exceptionally magnificent both in decoration and material".

== Attire ==
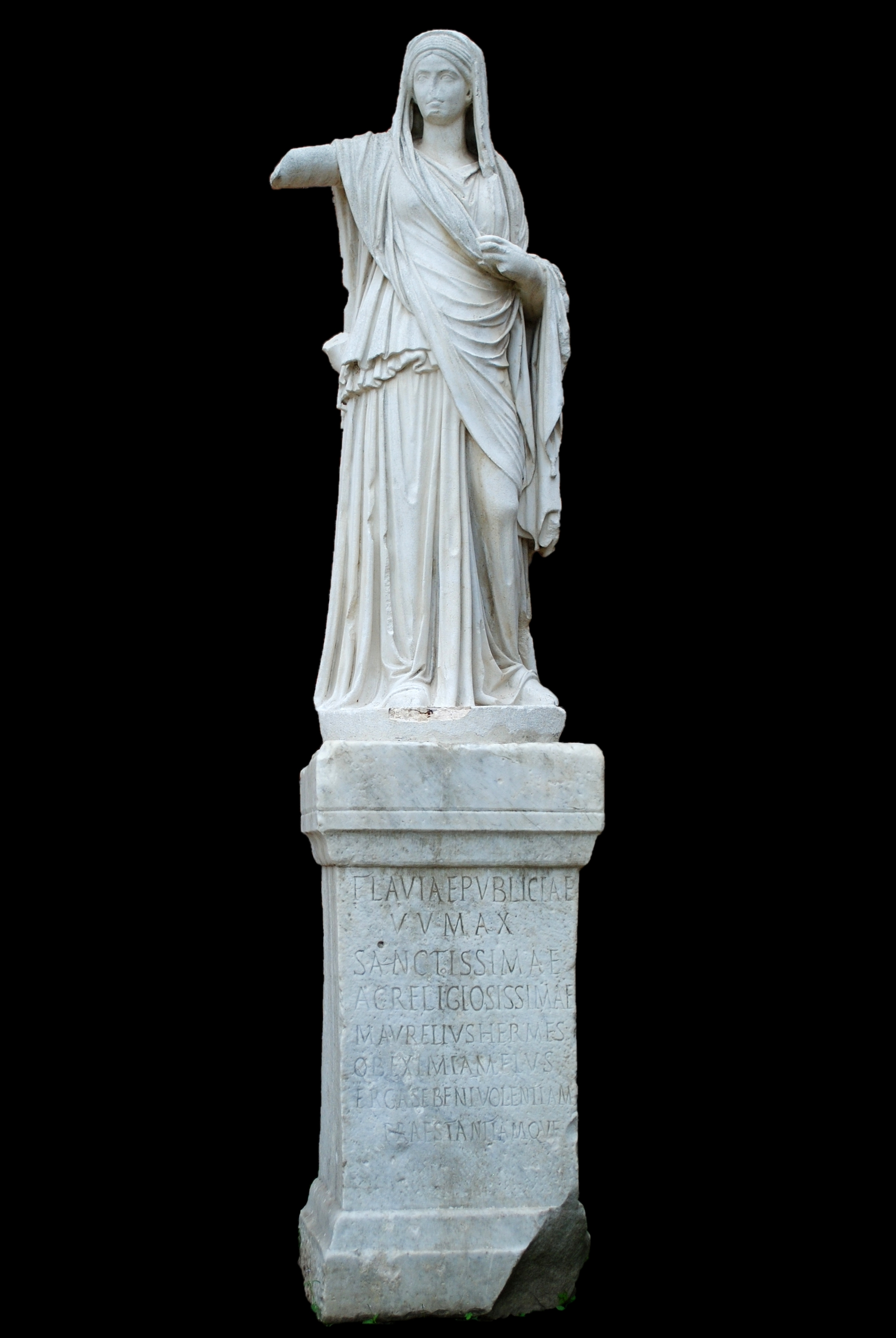
Statue of the Vestal Virgin Flavia Publicia in the House of the Vestals

Vestal costume had elements in common with high-status Roman bridal dress, and with the formal dress of high-status Roman matrons (married citizen-women). Vestals and matrons wore a long linen palla over a white woollen stola, a rectangular female citizen's wrap, equivalent to the male citizen's semi-circular toga. A Vestal's hair was bound into a white, priestly infula (head-covering or fillet) with red and white ribbons, usually tied together behind the head and hanging loosely over the shoulders.

The red ribbons of the Vestal infula were said to represent Vesta's fire; and the white, virginity, or sexual purity. The stola is associated with Roman citizen-matrons and Vestals, not with brides. This covering of the body by way of the gown and veils "signals the prohibitions that governed [the Vestals'] sexuality". The stola communicates the message of "hands off" and asserts their virginity. The prescribed everyday hairstyle for Vestals, and for brides only on their wedding day, comprised six or seven braids; this was thought to date back to the most ancient of times. In 2013, Janet Stephens recreated the hairstyle of the vestals on a modern person.

High-status brides were veiled in the same saffron-yellow flammeum as the Flamenica Dialis, priestess of Jupiter and wife to his high priest. Vestals wore a white, purple-bordered suffibulum (veil) when travelling outdoors, performing public rites or offering sacrifices. Respectable matrons were also expected to wear veils in public. One who appeared in public without her veil could be thought to have repudiated her marriage, making herself "available".

== Named Vestals ==
From the institution of the Vestal priesthood to its abolition, an unknown number of Vestals held office. Some are named in Roman myth and history and some are of unknown date. The 1st-century BC author Varro, names the first four, probably legendary Vestals as Gegania, Veneneia, Canuleia, and Tarpeia. Varro and others also portray Tarpeia, daughter of Spurius Tarpeius in the Sabine-Roman war, as a treasonous Vestal Virgin. Most Vestals named in Roman historical accounts are presented as examples of wrongdoing, threats to the well-being of the state, and punishment. While Tarpeia's status as a virgin is common to most accounts, her status as a vestal was likely the mythographer's invention, to cast her lust, greed and treason in the worst possible light.

Dionysius of Halicarnasus names Orbinia, a Vestal put to death in 471. Livy names a Vestal Postumia, tried for inchastity in 420, but acquitted with a warning to take her position more seriously: Minucia was put to death for inchastity in 337: and Sextilia, put to death for adultery in 273. Some Vestals are said to have committed suicide when accused; Caparronia supposedly did so in 266: essential trial details are often lacking. Livy states that two Vestals, Floronia and Opimia, were convicted of unchastity in 216. One committed suicide, the other was buried alive – he does not say which.

Vestals could exploit their familial and social connections, as well as their unique, untouchable status and privileges, taking the role of patron and protector. Cicero describes how the Vestal Claudia, daughter of Appius Claudius Pulcher, walked beside her father in his triumphal procession, to repulse a tribune of the plebs, who wanted to veto the triumph. Cicero also records a Vestal Fonteia, present during the trial of her brother in 69. Fabia, admitted to the order in 80 and made chief Vestal around 50, was half-sister of Terentia (Cicero's first wife), and full sister of Fabia the wife of Dolabella who later married her niece Tullia; she was probably mother of the later consul of that name. In 73 she was acquitted of incestum with Lucius Sergius Catilina. The case was prosecuted by Cicero.

The 1st century Vestal Licinia was supposedly courted by her kinsman, the so-called "triumvir" Marcus Licinius Crassus – who in fact wanted her property. This relationship gave rise to rumours. Plutarch says: "And yet when he was further on in years, he was accused of criminal intimacy with Licinia, one of the Vestal virgins and Licinia was formally prosecuted by a certain Plotius. Now Licinia was the owner of a pleasant villa in the suburbs which Crassus wished to get at a low price, and it was for this reason that he was forever hovering about the woman and paying his court to her until he fell under the abominable suspicion. And in a way, it was his avarice that absolved him from the charge of corrupting the Vestal, and he was acquitted by the judges. But he did not let Licinia go until he had acquired her property." Licinia became a Vestal in 85 and remained a Vestal until 61. The Vestals Arruntia, Perpennia M. f., and Popillia attended the inauguration of Lucius Cornelius Lentulus Niger as Flamen Martialis in 69. Licinia, Crassus' relative, was also present.

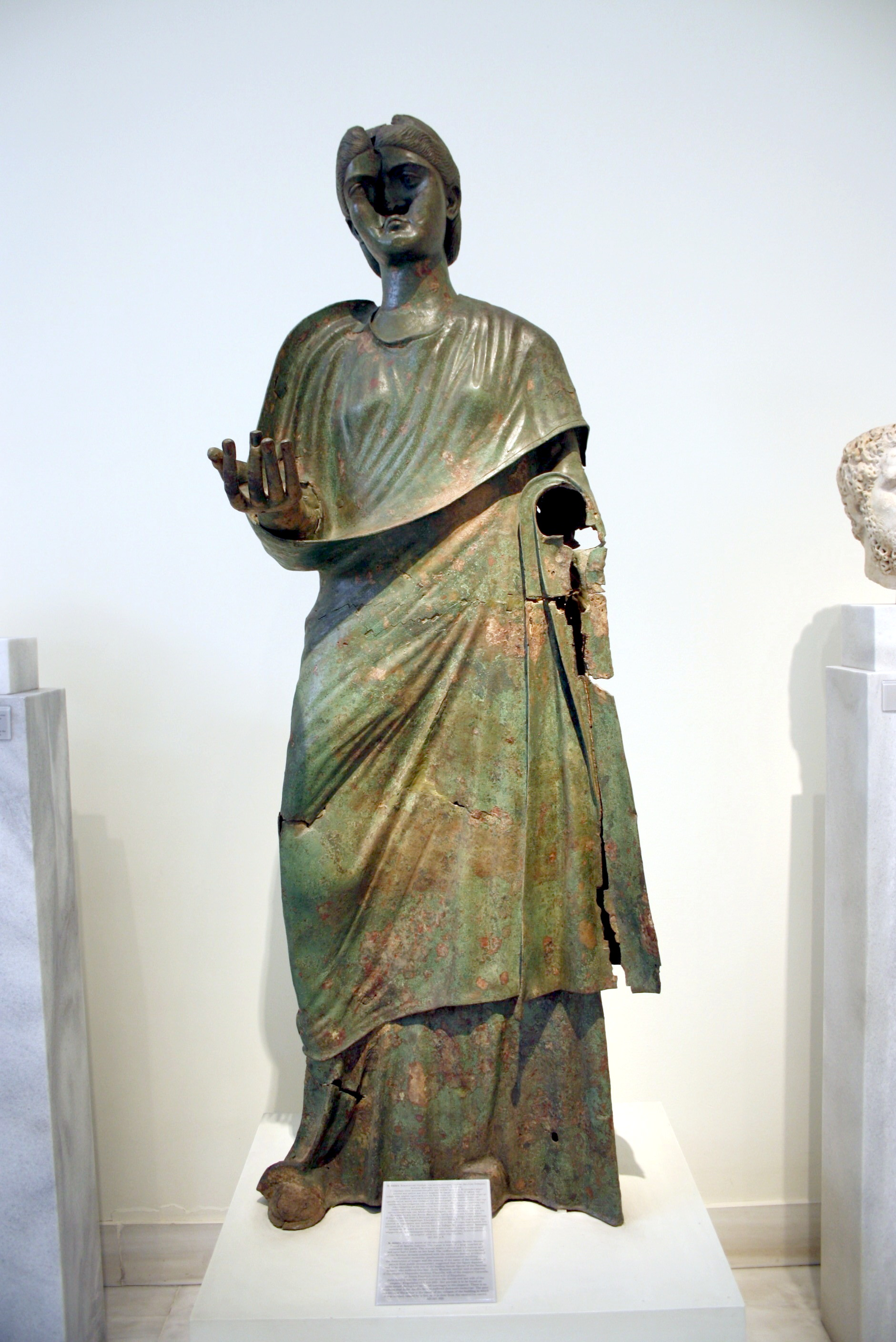
Bronze statue of Aquilia Severa, a vestal virgin whom the emperor Elagabalus (r. 218–222) forced to marry (National Archaeological Museum, Athens)

=== Imperial Vestals ===
- Junia Torquata (1st century), vestal under Tiberius, sister of Gaius Junius Silanus.
- Rubria (1st century), said by Suetonius to have been raped by Nero.
- Aquilia Severa (3rd century), whom Emperor Elagabalus married amid considerable scandal.
- Clodia Laeta (3rd century).
- Flavia Publicia (mid-3rd century).
- Coelia Concordia (4th century), the last head of the order.

=== Outside Rome ===
Inscriptions record the existence of Vestals in other locations than the centre of Rome.

- Manlia Severa, virgo Albana maxima, a chief Alban Vestal at Bovillae whose brother was probably the L. Manlius Severus named as a rex sacrorum in a funerary inscription. Mommsen thought he was rex sacrorum of Rome, but this is not considered likely.
- Flavia (or Valeria) Vera, a virgo vestalis maxima arcis Albanae, chief Vestal Virgin of the Alban arx (citadel).
- Caecilia Philete, a senior virgin (virgo maior) of Laurentum-Lavinium, as commemorated by her father, Q. Caecilius Papion. The title maior means at Lavinium the Vestals were only two.
- Saufeia Alexandria, Virgo Vestalis Tiburtium.
- Cossinia L(ucii) f(iliae), a Virgo Vestalis of Tibur (Tivoli).
- Primigenia, Alban vestal of Bovillae who had forsaken her vows of celibacy, mentioned by Symmachus in two of his letters.

== In Western art ==
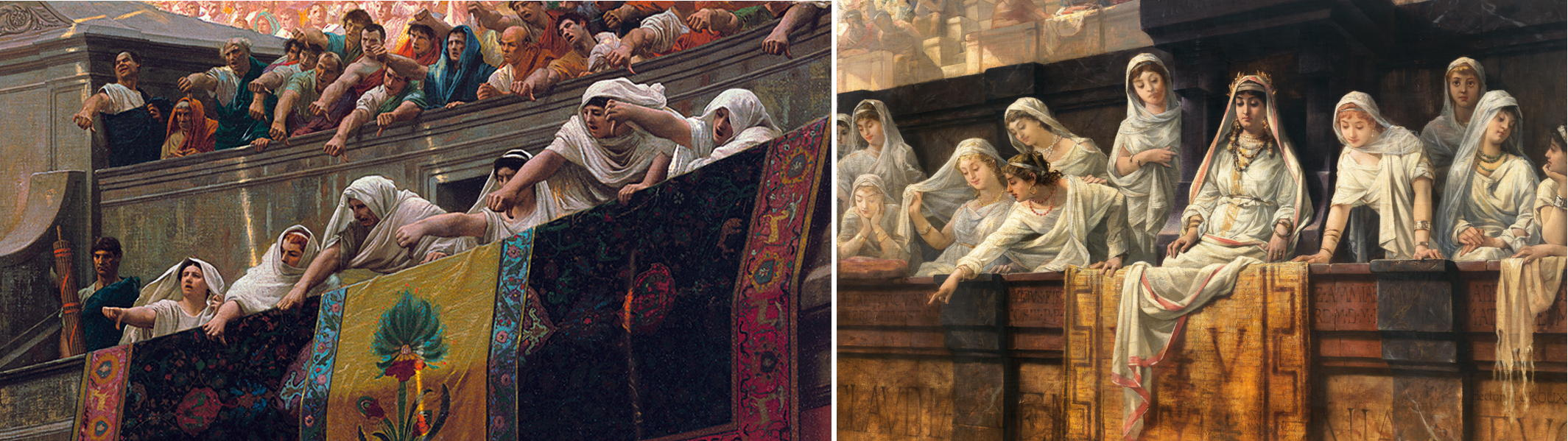
Two starkly different views by two French Academic painters of the Vestals in their front-rows seats at the Roman Colosseum: Pollice Verso (Thumbs Down), 1874, by Jean-Léon Gérôme (detail; Phoenix Art Museum), and the Vestals in a painting by Hector Leroux, c. 1890 (private collection).

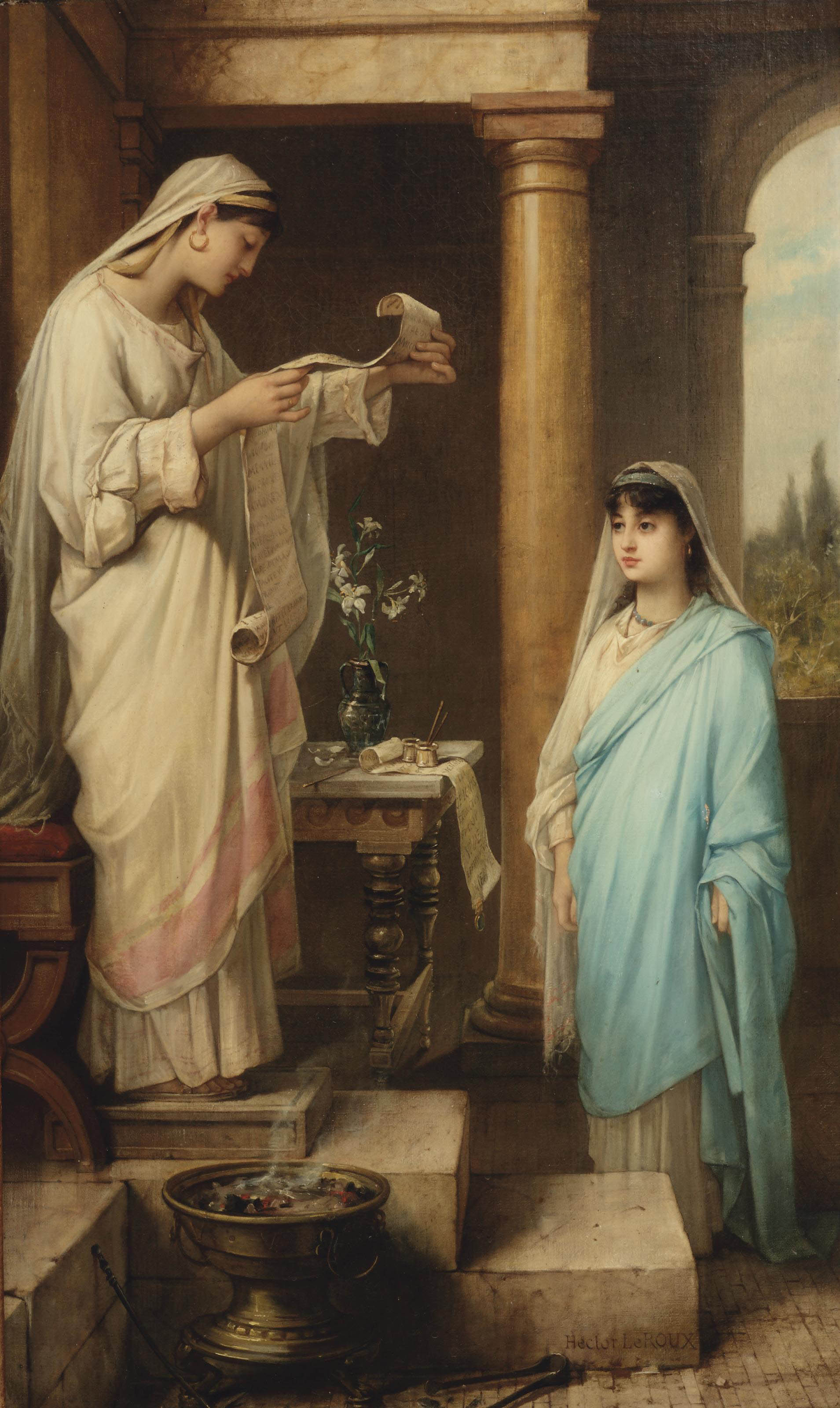
Hector Leroux, Inauguration of a Vestal, by 1900, private collection

The Vestals were used as models of female virtue in allegorizing portraiture of the later West. Elizabeth I of England was portrayed holding a sieve to evoke Tuccia, the Vestal who proved her virtue by carrying water in a sieve. Tuccia herself had been a subject for artists such as Jacopo del Sellaio (d. 1493) and Joannes Stradanus, and women who were arts patrons started having themselves painted as Vestals. In the libertine environment of 18th century France, portraits of women as Vestals seem intended as fantasies of virtue infused with ironic eroticism. Later, Vestals became an image of republican virtue, as in Jacques-Louis David's The Vestal Virgin.

Excavations in Rome and Pompeii, as well as translation of Latin sources, made Vestals a popular subject for artists in the 18th century and the 19th century. The French painter Hector Leroux, who lived and worked in Italy for seventeen years, became famous for meticulously researched images of Vestals in all aspects of their daily life and worship, making some thirty paintings of Vestals between 1863 and 1899.

Procol Harum's famous hit "A Whiter Shade of Pale" (1967) contains the lyrics "One of sixteen vestal virgins/ Who were leaving for the coast".

=== Portraits as Vestals ===
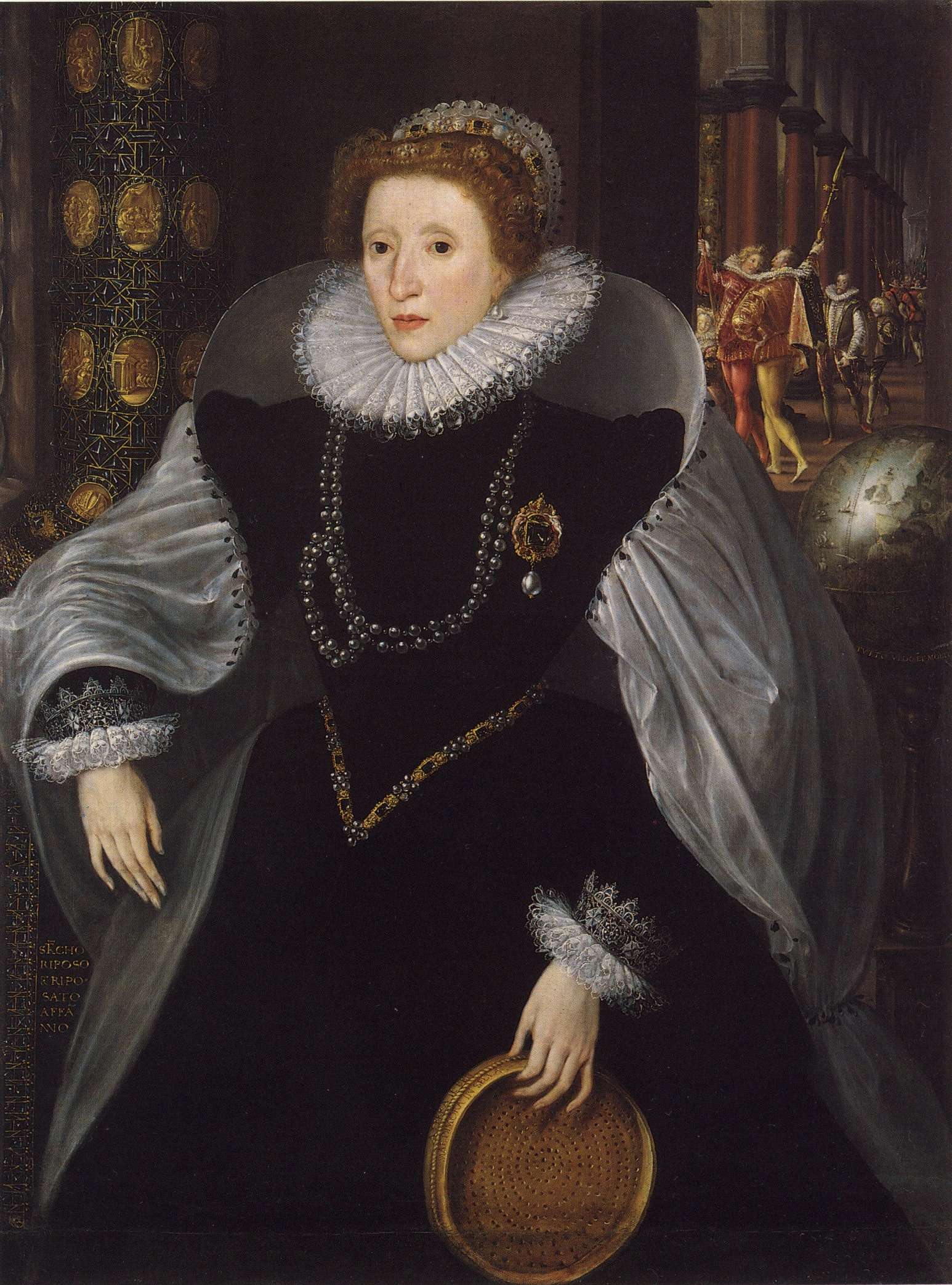
Sieve Portrait of Queen Elizabeth I (1583) by Quentin Metsys the Younger

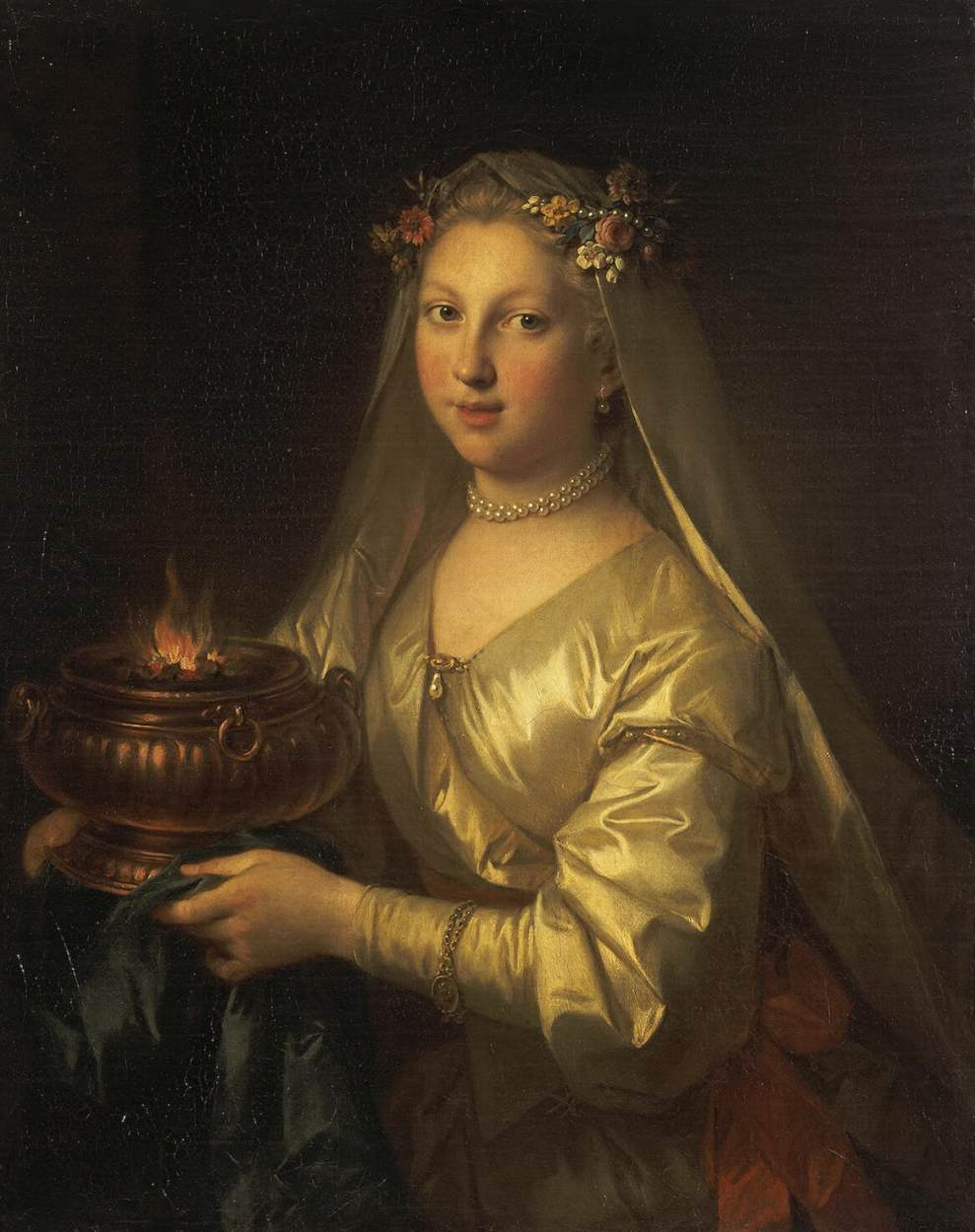
Vestal Virgin (1677–1730) by Jean Raoux

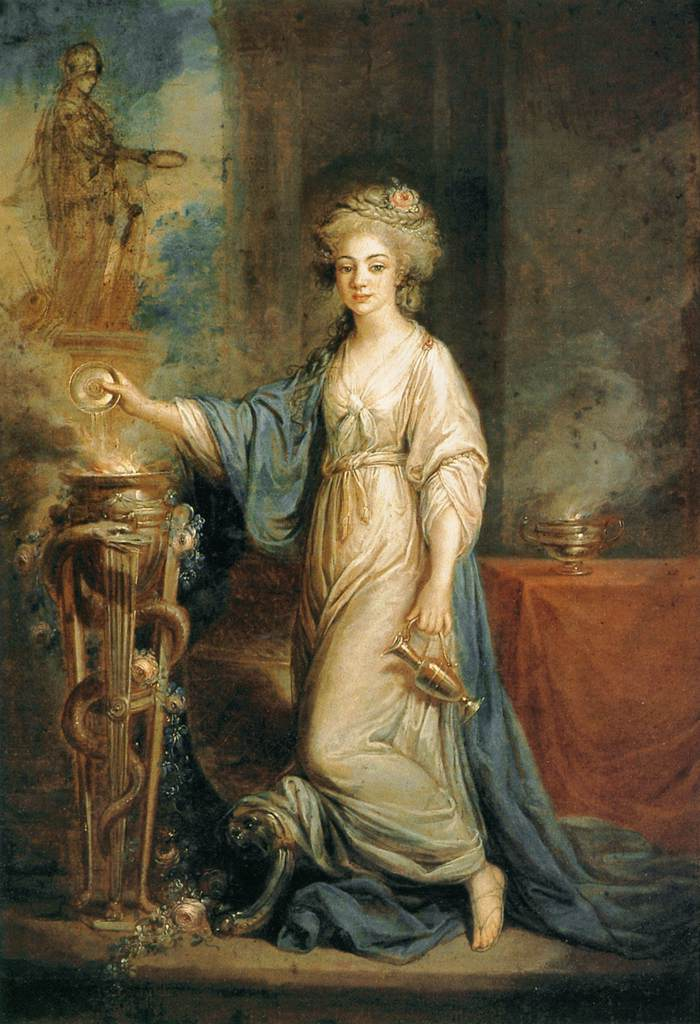
Portrait of a Woman as a Vestal Virgin (1770s) by Angelica Kauffman

== Bibliography ==
- Wildfang, Robin Lorsch (2006). Rome's Vestal Virgins. Taylor & Francis. ISBN 978-0-203-96838-3.
