= Falling (execution) =

Execution method

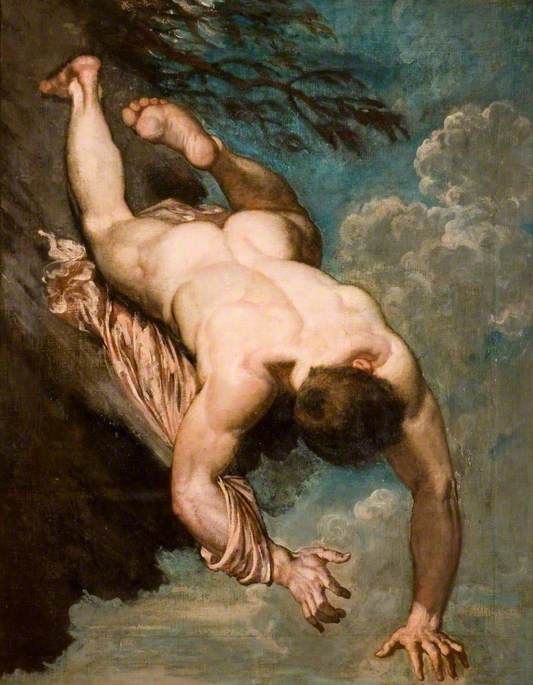
Manlius Hurled From The Rock by William Etty, 1818

Falling is execution by throwing or dropping a person from a great height. It has been used since ancient times. People executed in this way die from injuries caused by hitting the ground at high speed.

In ancient Delphi, the sacrilegious were hurled from the top of the Hyampeia, the high crag of the Phaedriades to the east of the Castalian Spring.

In pre-Roman Sardinia, elderly people who were unable to support themselves were ritually killed. They were intoxicated with a neurotoxic plant known as the "sardonic herb" (which some scientists think is hemlock water-dropwort) and then dropped from a high rock or beaten to death.

During the Roman Republic, the Tarpeian Rock, a steep cliff at the southern summit of the Capitoline Hill, was used for public executions. Murderers and traitors, if convicted by the quaestores parricidii, were flung from the cliff to their deaths.

Suetonius records the rumours of cruelty by Tiberius during the later part of the emperor's reign while the latter was living at Capri. Tiberius was said to execute people, most notably boys whose sexual company he had grown tired of, by having them thrown from a cliff into the sea while he watched. Some were tortured before being executed, and if they survived the fall, men waiting below in boats would break their bones with oars and boathooks.

In pre-colonial South Africa, several tribes including the Xhosa and the Zulu had named execution hills, from which miscreants were hurled to their deaths. These societies had no form of imprisonment; thus, legal penalties necessarily consisted of corporal punishment, capital punishment, or expulsion. It is alleged that during the Namibian war of independence numerous, SWAPO rebels were dropped from South African helicopters over the sea.

During the Spanish Civil War, partisans were sometimes executed by being thrown off cliffs at El Sardinero.

During Argentina's Dirty War of the late 1970s, those secretly abducted were often thrown from aircraft, in what were known as death flights.

Iran may have used this form of execution for the crime of sodomy. According to Amnesty International, in 2008 two men were convicted of raping two university students and sentenced to death.

In 2015, members of the Islamic State of Iraq and the Levant executed men who were accused of being gay by pushing them off towers.

== See also ==
- Defenestration
- Death flights
- Ättestupa
