= Tarpeian Rock =

Steep cliff used for executions in ancient Rome

Coordinates: 41°53′29″N 12°28′57″E

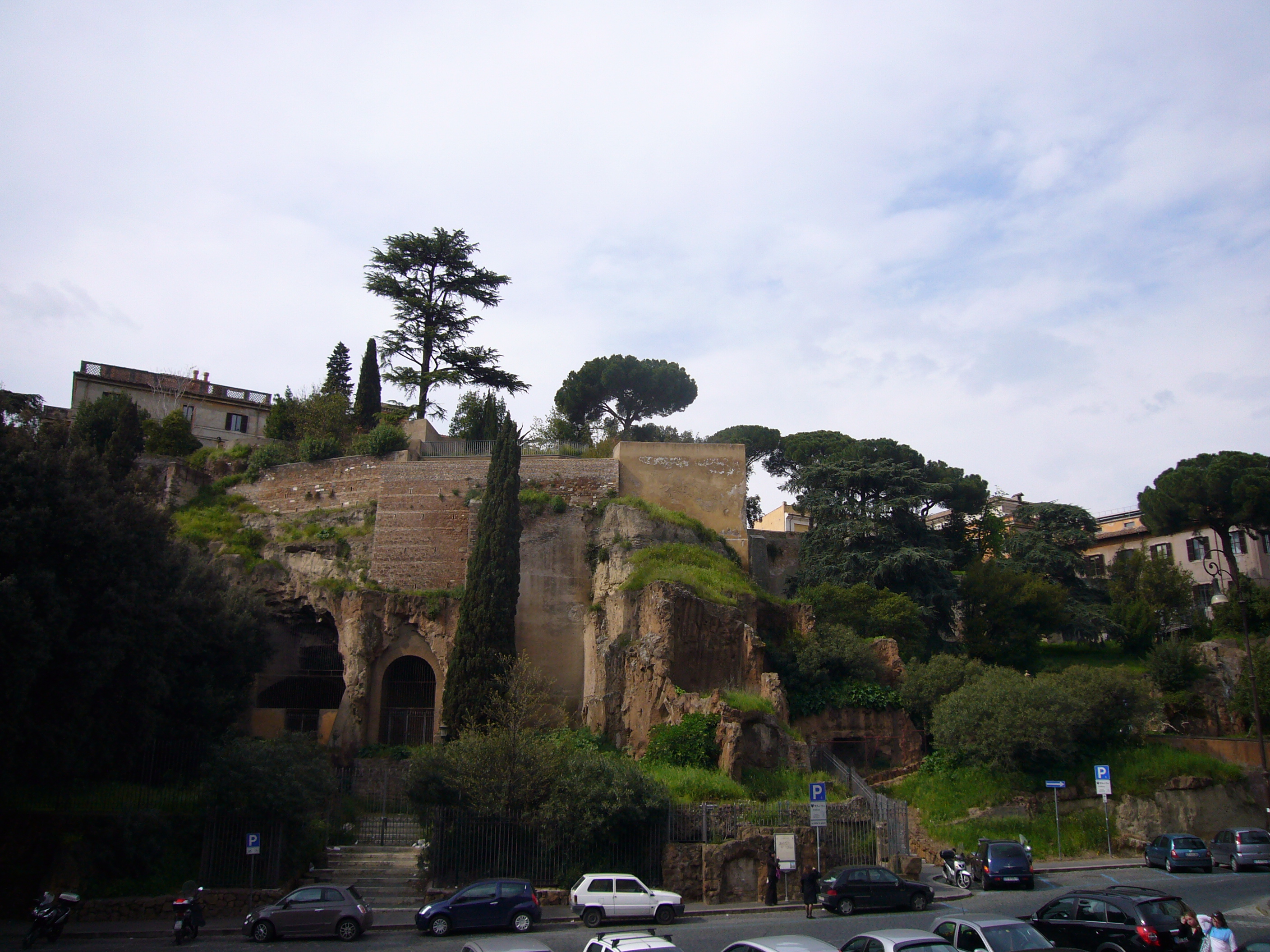
The site of the Tarpeian Rock as it appeared in 2008

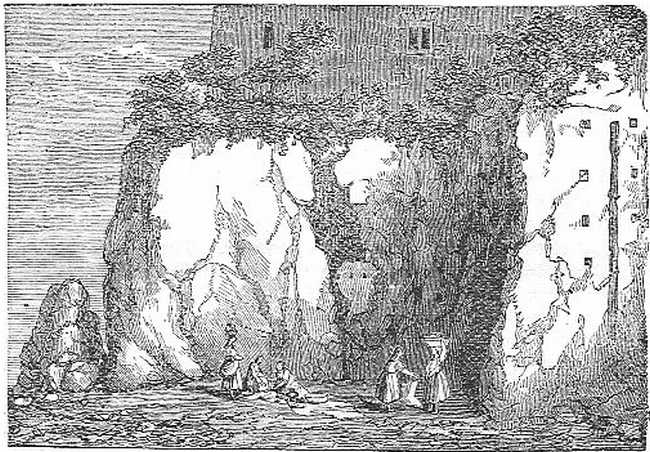
A 19th-century etching of the Tarpeian Rock

The Rock of Tarpeia (/tɑːrˈpiːən/; Latin: Rupes Tarpeia or Saxum Tarpeium; Italian: Rupe Tarpea) is a steep cliff on the south side of the Capitoline Hill that was used in Ancient Rome as a site of execution.

Adjudicated murderers, traitors, perjurors, and larcenous slaves, if convicted by the quaestores parricidii, were flung from the cliff to their deaths. The cliff was about 25 meters (80 ft) high.

== Roman legend ==
According to early Roman histories, when the Sabine ruler Titus Tatius attacked Rome after the Rape of the Sabines (8th century BC), the Vestal Virgin Tarpeia, daughter of Spurius Tarpeius, governor of the citadel on the Capitoline Hill, betrayed the Romans by opening the Porta Pandana gate for Titus Tatius in return for "what the Sabines bore on their arms" (golden bracelets and bejeweled rings). In Book 1 of Livy's Ab Urbe Condita, the Sabines "having been accepted into the citadel, [the Sabines] killed her, having been overwhelmed by weapons, and "scuta congesta", meaning, "they heaped up shields [on her]". The invaders crushed her to death with their shields ("what the Sabines bore on their arms"), and her body was buried in the rock that now bears her name. Regardless of whether or not Tarpeia was buried in the rock itself, it is significant that the rock bore the name of the traitress.

About 500 BC, Lucius Tarquinius Superbus, the seventh legendary king of Rome, levelled the top of the rock, removing the shrines built by the Sabines, and built the Temple of Jupiter Capitolinus on the intermontium, the area between the two summits of the hill. The rock itself survived the remodelling and was used for executions well into Sulla's time (early 1st century BC).

There is a Latin phrase, Arx tarpeia Capitoli proxima ('the Tarpeian Rock is close to the Capitol'), a warning that one's fall from grace can come swiftly.

To be hurled off the Tarpeian Rock was, from a certain perspective, a fate worse than mere death because it carried with it the stigma of shame. The rock was reserved for the most notorious traitors and as a place of unofficial, extra-legal executions such as the near-execution in 491 BC of legendary then-Senator Gaius Marcius Coriolanus by a mob whipped into frenzy by a tribune of the plebs.

== Notable victims ==
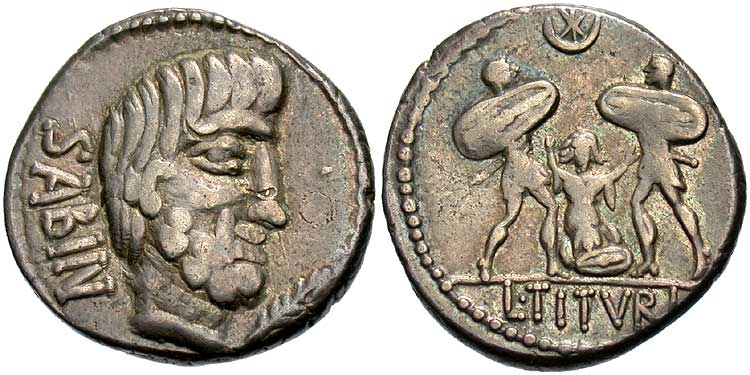
The torture of Tarpeia. Roman Republican coinage (denarius), 89 BC

Victims of this punishment included:

- Spurius Cassius Vecellinus, 485 BC, for perduellio (i.e. high treason)
- Marcus Manlius Capitolinus, 384 BC, for sedition
- Rebels from Tarentum, 212 BC
- Lucius Cornelius Chrysogonus, 80 BC
- Syllaeus or Syllaios, 6 BC
- Aelius Saturninus, AD 23
- Sextus Marius, a rich man from Spain with copper and gold mines confiscated by Tiberius and executed in AD 33 after being accused of incest.
- Barbatius Philippus

== In fiction ==
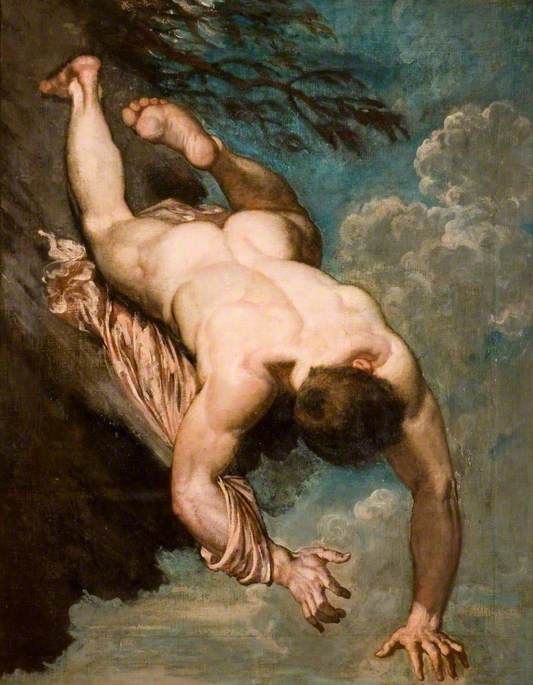
Manlius Hurled From The Rock by William Etty, 1818

- Canto IX of Purgatory of the Divine Comedy by Dante Alighieri has a reference to the Tarpeian Rock. When Metellusus yielded to Julius Caesar, the rock, close by, was said to creak when the door to the treasury was opened. The symbolic meaning is obvious as Caesar was criticized for robbing the public treasury of Roman Republic.
- The Tarpeian Rock is briefly mentioned in Act Three, Scene Three of the Shakespeare tragedy Coriolanus. In lines 87–90, Coriolanus warns:

"Let them pronounce the steep Tarpeian death,/

Vagabond exile, flaying, pent to linger/ But with a grain a day; I would not buy/

Their mercy at the price of one fair word."

- In lines 99–104, Sicinius Velutus gives judgment:

"we/ Even from this instant, banish him our city,/

In peril of precipitation/ From off the rock Tarpeian, never more/

To enter our Rome gates."

- In Miguel de Cervantes's Don Quixote the image of Nero watching the burning of Rome is related to the fires of passion. In Part 1, Chapter 14 Ambrosio accuses Marcela of being a cruel Nero. In Part 2, Chapter 44, Altisidora accuses Don Quixote of being a new Nero who watches her burn with love from the Tarpeian Rock: "No mires de tu Tarpeya / este incendio que me abrasa / Neron manchego del mundo."
- In Nathaniel Hawthorne's The Marble Faun, a character is murdered by another character by being thrown from the Tarpeian Rock.
- In The Cantos, Ezra Pound includes reference to the "Rupe Tarpeia" in "Notes for CXVII etc seq.": "Under the Rupe Tarpeia/ weep out your jealousies--/ To make a church/ or an altar to Zagreus/ Son of Semele/ Without jealousy/ like the double arch of a window/ Or some great colonnade."
- The Tarpeian Cliff is mentioned multiple times in I, Claudius by Robert Graves, as a place of execution by hurling over the edge.
- In Asterix and the Laurel Wreath, the jailer at the Circus Maximus remarks to Asterix and Obelix that, while they are getting a gourmet feast leading up to the day they are thrown to the lions: "Those who are thrown from the Tarpeian Rock are given solid, heavy food."
- In the HBO TV series Rome, Julius Caesar refers to the site while trying to motivate his soldiers to march to Rome in opposition to the Senate. Later, he tells Lucius Vorenus that he could throw him from the Tarpeian Rock for his heroic crimes, but makes him a senator instead to appease the people of Rome.
- In A Capitol Death by Lindsey Davis, three deaths involve falls from the Tarpeian Rock.

== See also ==
- Gemonian stairs
- Mamertine Prison

== Sources ==
- Grant, Michael (1971), Roman Myths, New York: Scribner's, pg 123.
- Livy, Book 1
- Twelve Tables
