= Hyampeia =

Coordinates: 38°29′19″N 22°31′03″E

Hyampeia is a mountain peak above the Castalian Spring in Delphi, Greece. Its modern name is Flemboukos. It is the eastern peak of the Phaedriades, the western peak was known as Nauplia. According to Herodotus, there was a sacred precinct at the foot of Hyampeia dedicated to the Delphic hero Autonous at the time of the Persian Wars. A battle between the Delphians and the Persians took place here during that war in which the Delphians won and prevented the Persians from looting Delphi.
