= Empanda ornata =

Scientific classification
- Kingdom: Animalia
- Phylum: Arthropoda
- Subphylum: Chelicerata
- Class: Arachnida
- Order: Araneae
- Infraorder: Araneomorphae
- Family: Salticidae
- Subfamily: Salticinae
- Genus: Empanda; Simon, 1903
- Species: E. ornata

Binomial name
- Empanda ornata (Peckham & Peckham, 1885)

Species of spider

Empanda ornata is a species of jumping spiders (family Salticidae). It is the only species in the genus Empanda, and is only found in Guatemala.

== Name ==
The genus name is derived from the Roman goddess Empanda. The species name is Latin for "adorned".
