= Marcus Manlius Capitolinus =

Roman hero who saved the Capitol from a Gaulish attack

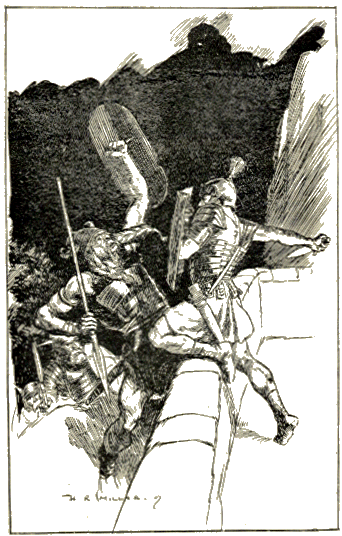
Marcus Manlius shown attacking Gauls

Marcus Manlius Capitolinus (died 384 BC) was consul of the Roman Republic in 392 BC. He was a brother of Aulus Manlius Capitolinus, consular tribune five times between 389 and 370 BC. The Manlii were one of the leading patrician gentes that dominated the politics of the early Republic.

== Biography ==
During the Gallic siege of Rome in 390 BC, the account of which has been greatly mythologized, Marcus Manlius held out on the citadel with a small garrison, while the rest of Rome was abandoned. When Gauls under the command of Brennus attempted to scale the Capitoline, Manlius was roused by the cackling of the sacred geese of Juno, rushed to the spot, and threw down the foremost assailants.

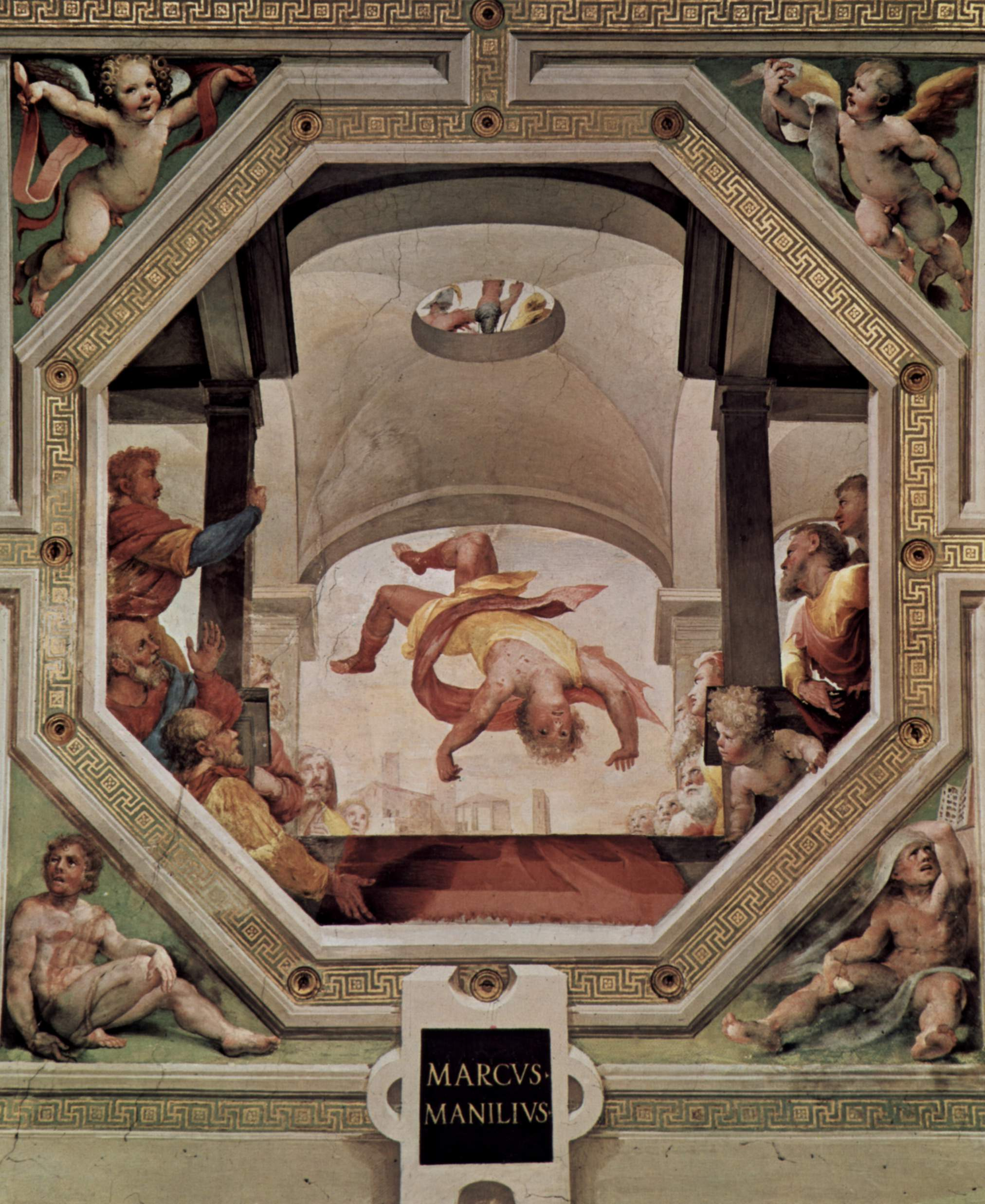
fresco of Manlius tossed from the Tarpeian Rock by Beccafumi in Palazzo Pubblico of Siena

After the sack of Rome left the plebeians in pitiful condition, they were forced to borrow large sums of money from the patricians, and once again became the poor debtor class of Rome. Manlius, the hero of Rome, fought for them. Livy says that he was the first patrician to act as a populist. Seeing a centurion led to prison for debt, he freed him with his own money, and even sold his estate to relieve other poor debtors, while he accused the senate of embezzling public money. He was charged with aspiring to kingly power, and condemned by the comitia, but not until the assembly had adjourned to a place outside the walls, where they could no longer see the Capitol which he had saved. The Senate condemned him to death in 385 BC, and he was thrown from the Tarpeian Rock. Some scholars suggest that Livy's portrait of Manlius is modeled on the first-century rebel Catiline, and blends different moments in Rome's recent past.

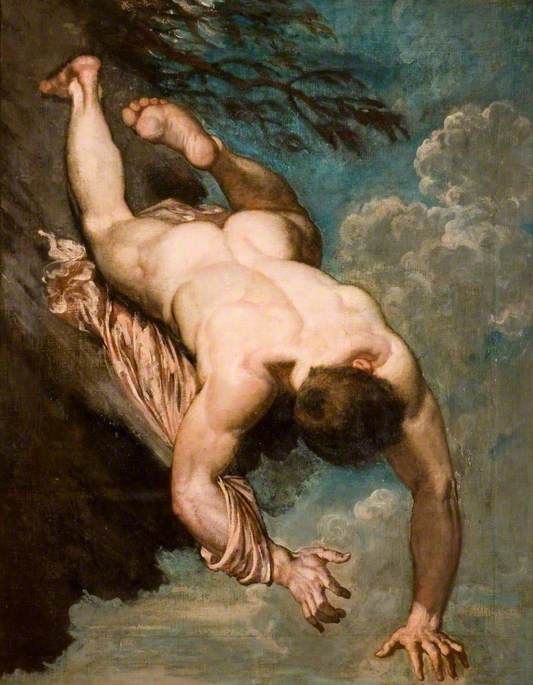
Manlius Hurled From The Rock by William Etty, 1818

Manlius' house on the Capitoline Hill was razed, and the Senate decreed that no patrician should live there henceforth. The Manlii themselves resolved that no patrician Manlius should bear the name of Marcus. According to Mommsen, the story of the saving of the Capitol was a later invention to justify his cognomen, which may be better explained by his domicile. Some scholars consider him the second martyr in the cause of social reform at Rome.

Pliny the Elder describes Manlius among his "instances of extreme courage":

The military honours of Manlius Capitolinus would have been no less splendid than [those of Titus Caecilius Denter], (Note: An uncertain individual, as the Caecilii did not regularly use the praenomen Titus. According to translator John Bostock, Hardouin argues that Pliny probably means Lucius Caecilius Metellus Denter, who was slain in battle against the Gauls at the Lake Vadimo in 283 BC. Another possibility is his son, who gained a famous victory at the Battle of Panormus during the First Punic War, and later, while Pontifex Maximus, rushed into a burning temple to rescue a sacred artifact, losing his sight in the process. The only Titus Caecilius whom Pliny could have meant was a centurion primus pilus at the Battle of Ilerda during the Civil War in 49 BC, of whom Caesar only mentions that he was among those who fell in the battle.) if they had not been all effaced at the close of his life. Before his seventeenth year, he had gained two spoils, and was the first of equestrian rank who received a mural crown; he also gained six civic crowns, thirty seven donations, and had twenty-three scars on the fore-part of his body. He saved the life of P. Servilius, the master of the horse, receiving wounds on the same occasion in the shoulders and the thigh. Besides all this, unaided, he saved the Capitol, when it was attacked by the Gauls, and through that, the state itself; a thing that would have been the most glorious act of all, if he had not so saved it, in order that he might, as its king, become its master. But in all matters of this nature, although valour may effect much, fortune does still more.

== Notes ==
Political offices
Preceded by Lucius Lucretius Tricipitinus Flavus (Suffect); Servius Sulpicius Camerinus (Suffect)	Consul of the Roman Republic with Lucius Valerius Potitus Poplicola II; 392 BC	Succeeded by Consular tribunes
