= Temple of Jupiter Optimus Maximus =

Temple on the Capitoline Hill of Ancient Rome

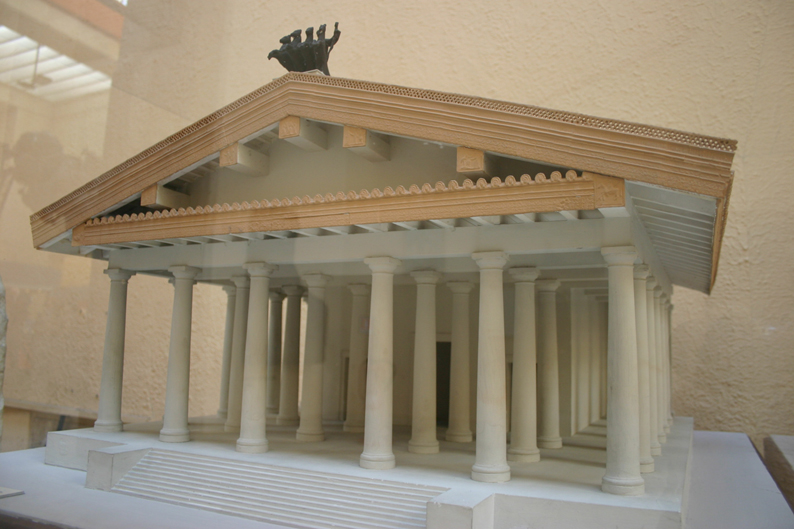
- Speculative model of the first Temple of Jupiter Optimus Maximus, 509 BC

- Shown in ancient Rome
- Interactive map of Temple of Jupiter Optimus Maximus
- 41°53′32″N 12°28′54″E

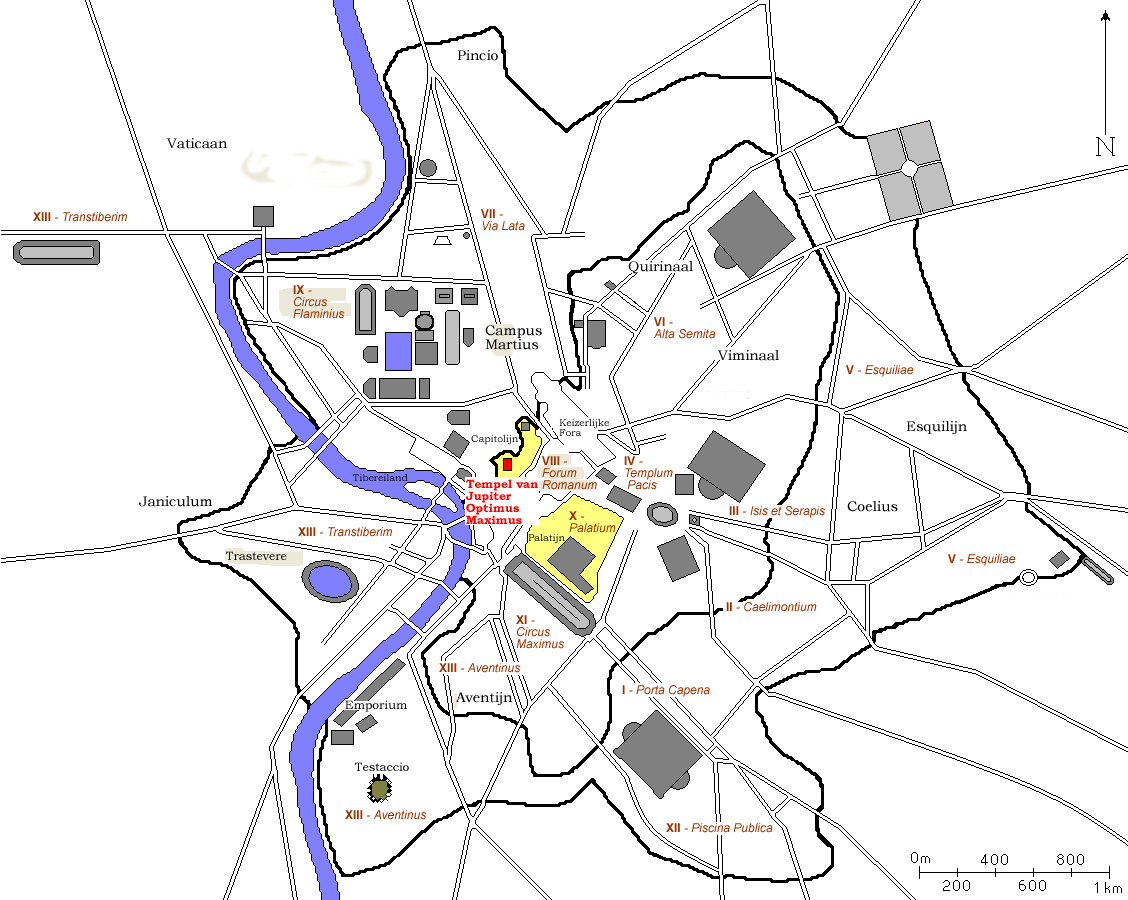
Location of the temple

The Temple of Jupiter Optimus Maximus, also known as the Temple of Jupiter Capitolinus (Latin: Aedes Iovis Optimi Maximi Capitolini; Italian: Tempio di Giove Ottimo Massimo; lit. 'Temple of Jupiter, the Best and Greatest'), was the most important temple in Ancient Rome, located on the Capitoline Hill. It was surrounded by the Area Capitolina, a precinct where numerous shrines, altars, statues and victory trophies were displayed.

Traditionally dedicated in 509 BC, the first building was the oldest and most important large temple in Archaic Rome. It was the largest in the Italian world and reflected the wealth of Rome at the end of the Etruscan period.

Like many temples in central Italy, it shared features with Etruscan architecture; sources report that Etruscan specialists were brought in for various aspects of its construction, including the making and painting of antefixes and other terracotta decorations. Built of wood, this temple was destroyed by fire in 83 BC. Its reconstruction employed craftsmen summoned from Greece, and the new building is presumed to have been essentially Greek in style, though like other Roman temples it retained many elements of Etruscan form. The second iteration of the temple was completed in 69 BC. Fires in the ensuing centuries necessitated two further reconstructions, evidently following contemporary Roman architectural style, although of exceptional size.

The first version is the largest Etruscan-style temple recorded, and much larger than other Roman temples for centuries after. However, its size remains heavily disputed by specialists; based on an ancient visitor it has been claimed to have been almost 60 m × 60 m (200 ft × 200 ft), not far short of the largest Greek temples. Whatever its size, its influence on other early Roman temples was significant and long-lasting. Reconstructions usually show very wide eaves, and a wide colonnade stretching down the sides, though not round the back wall as it would have done in a typical Greek temple. A crude image on a coin of 78 BC shows only four columns, and a very busy roofline.

With two further fires, the third temple only lasted five years, to 80 AD, but the fourth survived until the fall of the empire. Remains of the last temple survived to be pillaged for spolia in the Middle Ages and Renaissance, but now only elements of the foundations and podium or base survive; as the subsequent temples apparently reused these, they may partly date to the first building. Much about the various buildings remains uncertain.

== History ==
=== First building ===
Much of what is known of the first Temple of Jupiter is from later Roman tradition. King Lucius Tarquinius Priscus vowed this temple while battling with the Sabines and, according to Dionysius of Halicarnassus, began the terracing necessary to support the foundations of the temple. Much of the Cappellaccio tufa which forms the foundation of the Temple was probably mined directly from the site when it was excavated and levelled for the structure. Modern coring on the Capitoline has confirmed the extensive work needed just to create a level building site. According to Dionysius of Halicarnassus and Livy, the foundations and most of the superstructure of the temple were completed by Lucius Tarquinius Superbus, the last King of Rome.

Livy also records that before the temple's construction, shrines to other gods occupied the site. When the augurs carried out the rites seeking permission to remove them, only Terminus and Juventas were believed to have refused. Their shrines were therefore incorporated into the new structure. Because he was the god of boundaries, Terminus's refusal to be moved was interpreted as a favorable omen for the future of the Roman state. A second portent was the appearance of the head of a man to workmen digging the foundations of the temple. This was said by the augurs (including augurs brought especially from Etruria) to mean that Rome was to be the head of a great empire.

Livy reports that the Temple was dedicated on September 13 in the year the Roman Republic replaced the Roman Kingdom, which is 509 BC assuming the Varronian chronology. Cassius Dio and Plutarch agree with Livy's account. According to Dionysius of Halicarnassus, it was consecrated two years later, in 507 BC; Tacitus agrees with this interpretation. Dedication of the temple was the responsibility of the new joint heads of state, the two consuls that had been elected for that year. They allocated the duty by drawing lots; it fell to Marcus Horatius Pulvillus. Horatius was consul in both 509 and 507 BC, which is the origin of the disagreement over the date of consecration. Livy records that in 495 BC the Latins, as a mark of gratitude to the Romans for the release of 6,000 Latin prisoners, delivered a crown of gold to the temple.

The original temple may have measured almost 60 m × 60 m (200 ft × 200 ft), though this estimate is hotly disputed by some specialists. It was certainly considered the most important religious temple of the whole state of Rome. Each deity of the Triad had a separate cella, with Juno Regina on the left, Minerva on the right, and Jupiter Optimus Maximus in the middle. The first temple was decorated with many terra cotta sculptures. The most famous of these was of Jupiter driving a quadriga, a chariot drawn by four horses, which was on top of the roof as an acroterion. This sculpture, as well as the cult statue of Jupiter in the main cella, was said to have been the work of Etruscan artisan Vulca of Veii. An image of Summanus, a thunder god, was among the pedimental statues. The cult statue of Jupiter showed the god standing and wielding a thunderbolt, dressed in a tunica palmata (a tunic decorated with images of palm leaves), and the toga picta, dyed purple and bearing designs in gold thread. This costume became the standard dress for victorious generals celebrating a triumph.

The original temple decoration was discovered in 2014. The findings allowed the archaeologists to reconstruct for the first time the real appearance of the temple in the earliest phase. The wooden elements of the roof and lintels were lined with terracotta revetment plaques and other elements of exceptional size and richly decorated with painted reliefs, following the so-called Second Phase model (referring to the decorative systems of Etruscan and Latin temples), that had its first expression precisely with the Temple of Jupiter Optimus Maximus. The temple, which immediately rose to fame, established a new model for sacred architecture that was adopted in the terracotta decorations of many temples in Italy up to the 2nd century BC. The original elements were partially replaced with other elements in different style in the early 4th century BC and anew at the end of the 3rd – early 2nd century BC. The removed material was dumped into the layers forming the square in front of the temple, the so-called Area Capitolina, in the middle years the 2nd century BC.

Repairs and improvements were undertaken over the course of the temple's lifetime, including the re-stuccoing of the columns and walls in 179 BC, the addition of mosaic flooring in the cella after the Third Punic War, and the gilding of the coffered ceiling inside the cella in 142 BC. Over the years the temple accrued countless statues and trophies dedicated by victorious generals, and in 179 some of these attached to the columns were removed to lessen the clutter.

The plan and exact dimensions of the temple have been heavily debated. Five different plans of the temple have been published following recent excavations on the Capitoline Hill that revealed portions of the archaic foundations. According to Dionysius of Halicarnassus, the same plan and foundations were used for later rebuildings of the temple, but there is disagreement over what the dimensions he mentions referred to (the building itself or the podium).

The first temple burned in 83 BC, during the civil wars under the dictatorship of Sulla. Also lost in this fire were the Sibylline Books, which were said to have been written by classical sibyls, and stored in the temple to be guarded and consulted by the quindecimviri (council of fifteen) on matters of state only in emergencies.

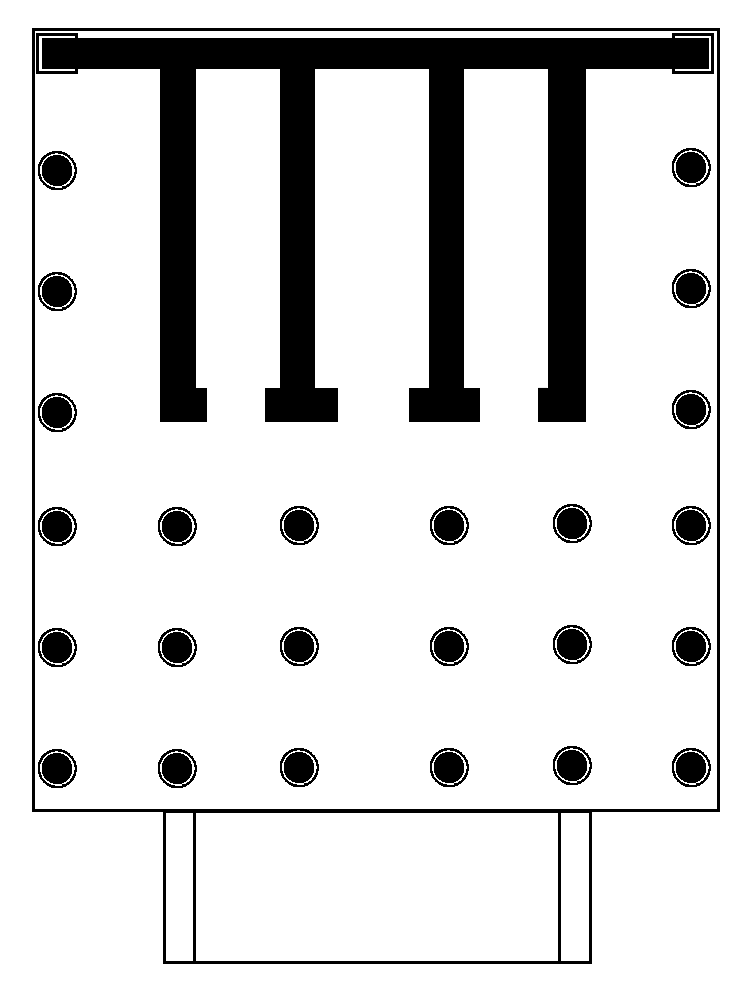
Speculative plan of the first temple

Another of the many guesses at a plan

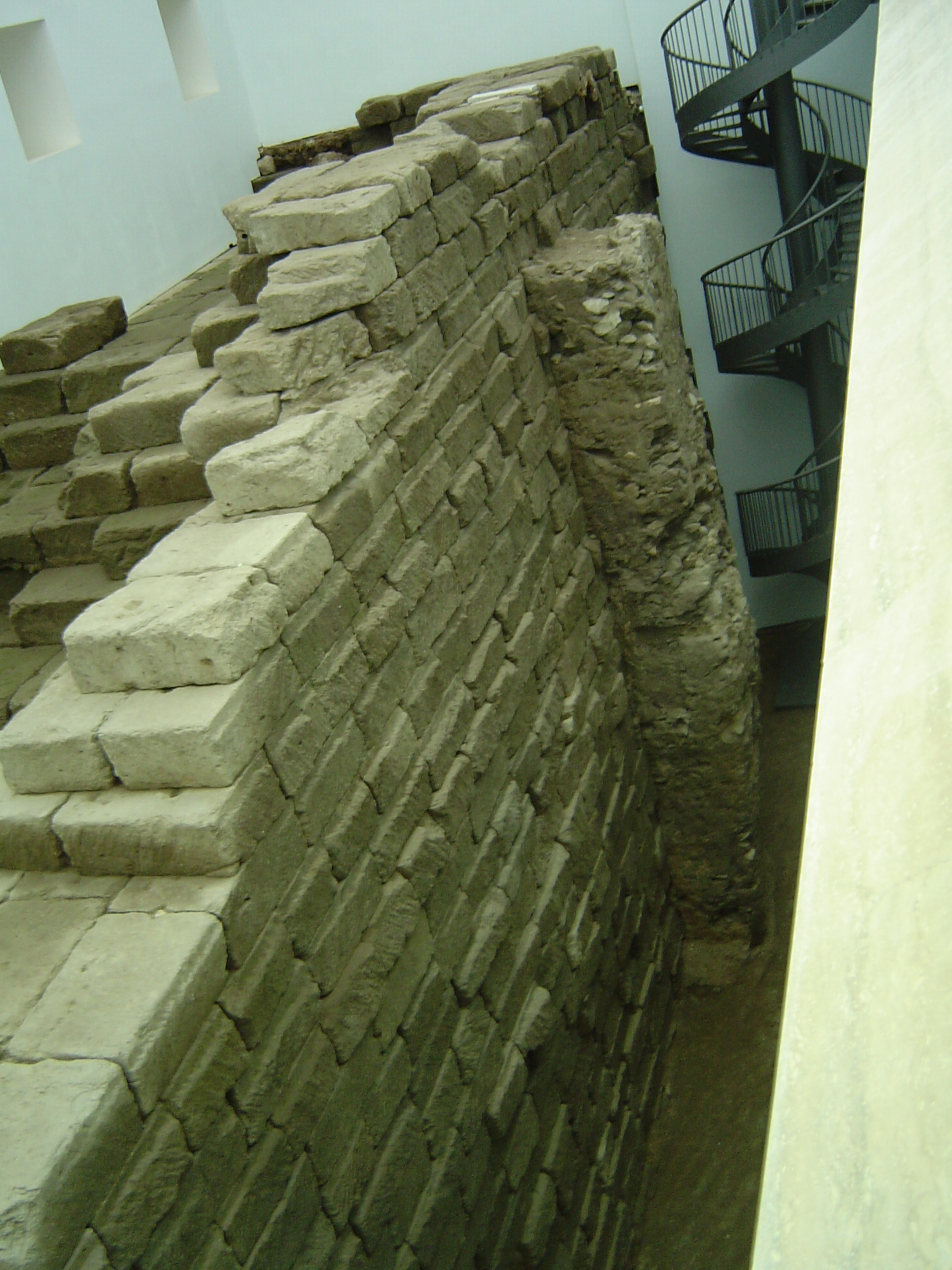
Back wall in 2005

=== Second building ===
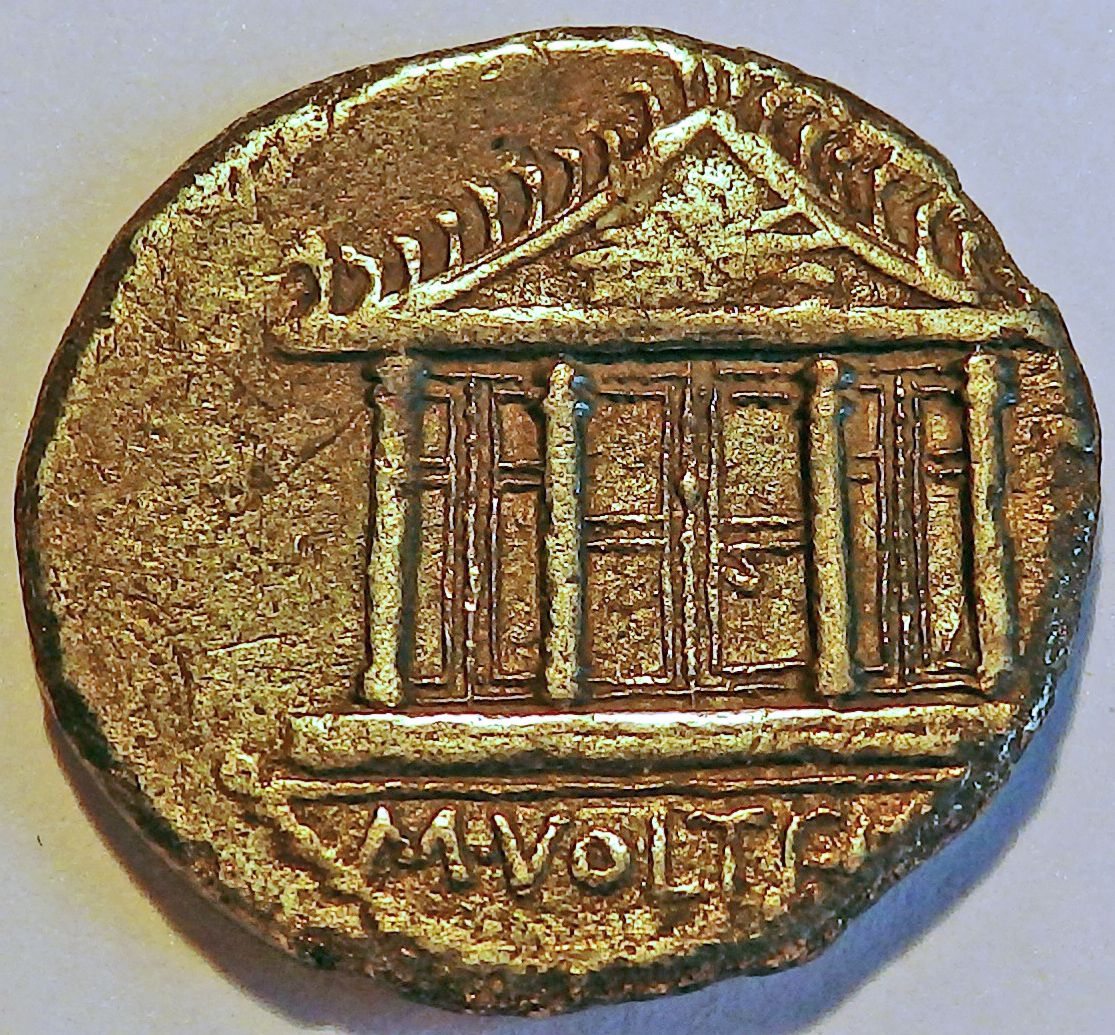
Coin of 78 BC, during the building of the second temple

During Lucius Cornelius Sulla's sack of Athens in 86 BC, while looting the city, Sulla seized some of the gigantic incomplete columns from the Temple of Zeus and transported them back to Rome, where they were re-used in the Temple of Jupiter. Whether Sulla actually used the entire columns in the temple is not confirmed; the columns from the Temple of Zeus were extraordinarily long and so may have been inappropriate for the Temple of Jupiter. Therefore, it is suggested that either just the capitals were used or the columns off the archaic Peisistratid Temple to Zeus. Sulla hoped to live until the temple was rebuilt, but Quintus Lutatius Catulus Capitolinus had the honor of dedicating the new structure in 69 BC. The new temple was built to the same plan on the same foundations, but with more expensive materials for the superstructure. Literary sources indicate that the temple was not entirely completed until the late 60s BC. Around 65 AD the three new cult statues were completed. The chryselephantine statue of Jupiter was sculpted by Apollonius of Athens; its appearance is generally known from replicas created for other temples of Jupiter in the Roman colonies. It featured Jupiter seated with a thunderbolt and scepter in either hand, and possibly an image of the goddess Roma in one hand as well.

Brutus and the other assassins locked themselves inside it after murdering Caesar. The new temple of Quintus Lutatius Catulus was renovated and repaired by Augustus. The second building burnt down during the course of fighting on the hill on 19 December of 69 AD, when an army loyal to Vespasian battled to enter the city in the Year of the Four Emperors.

=== Third building ===
The new emperor, Vespasian, rapidly rebuilt the temple on the same foundations but with a lavish superstructure. It was taller than the previous structures, with a Corinthian order and statuary including a quadriga atop the gable and bigae driven by figures of Victory on either side at the base of the roof. The third temple of Jupiter was dedicated in 75 AD. The third temple burned during the reign of Titus in 80 AD.

=== Fourth building ===
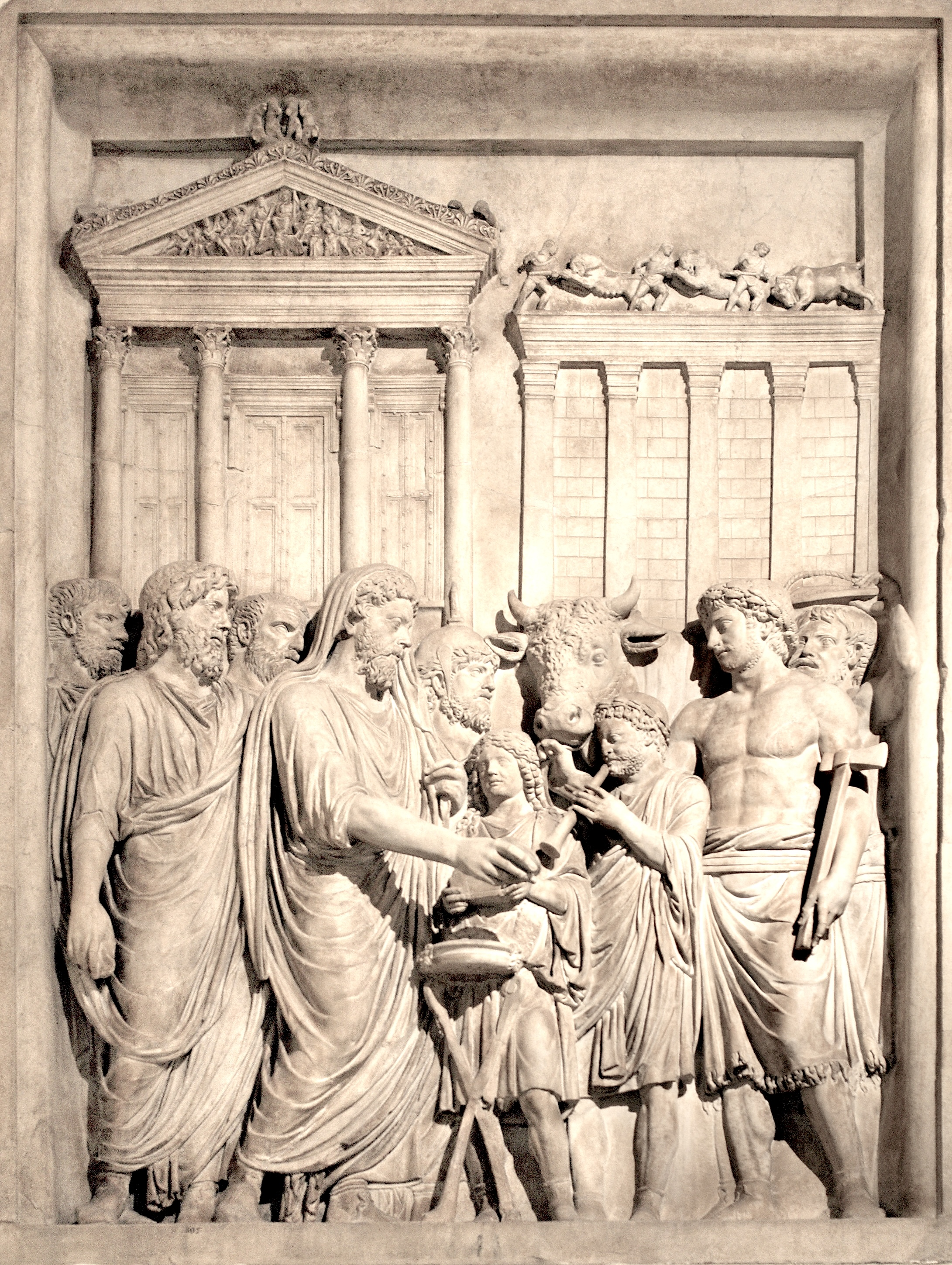
Relief of Marcus Aurelius sacrificing at the fourth temple

Domitian immediately began rebuilding the temple, again on the same foundations, but with the most lavish superstructure yet. According to Plutarch, Domitian used at least twelve thousand talents of gold for the gilding of the bronze roof tiles alone. Elaborate sculpture adorned the pediment. A Renaissance drawing of a damaged relief in the Louvre Museum shows a four-horse chariot (quadriga) beside a two-horse chariot (biga) to the right of the latter at the highest point of the pediment, the two statues serving as the central acroterion, and statues of the god Mars and goddess Venus surmounting the corners of the cornice, serving as acroteria. It was completed in 82 AD. In the centre of the pediment the god Jupiter was flanked by Juno and Minerva, seated on thrones. Below was an eagle with wings spread out. A biga driven by the sun god and a biga driven by the moon were depicted either side of the three gods.

=== Decline and abandonment ===
The temple completed by Domitian is thought to have lasted more or less intact for over three hundred years, until all pagan temples were closed by Emperor Theodosius I in 392 during the persecution of pagans in the late Roman Empire. In the 4th century, Ammianus Marcellinus referred to the temple as "the Capitolium, with which revered Rome elevates herself to eternity, the whole world beholds nothing more magnificent." During the 5th century the temple was damaged by Stilicho (who according to Zosimus removed the gold that adorned the doors). Procopius states that the Vandals plundered the temple during the sack of Rome in 455, stripping away half of the gilded bronze tiles. Despite this, in the early 6th century Cassiodorus described the temple as one of the wonders of the world. In 571, Narses removed many of the statues and ornaments. The ruins were still well preserved in 1447 when the 15th-century humanist Poggio Bracciolini visited Rome. The remaining ruins were destroyed in the 16th century, when Giovanni Pietro Caffarelli built a palace (Palazzo Caffarelli) on the site.

== Remains ==
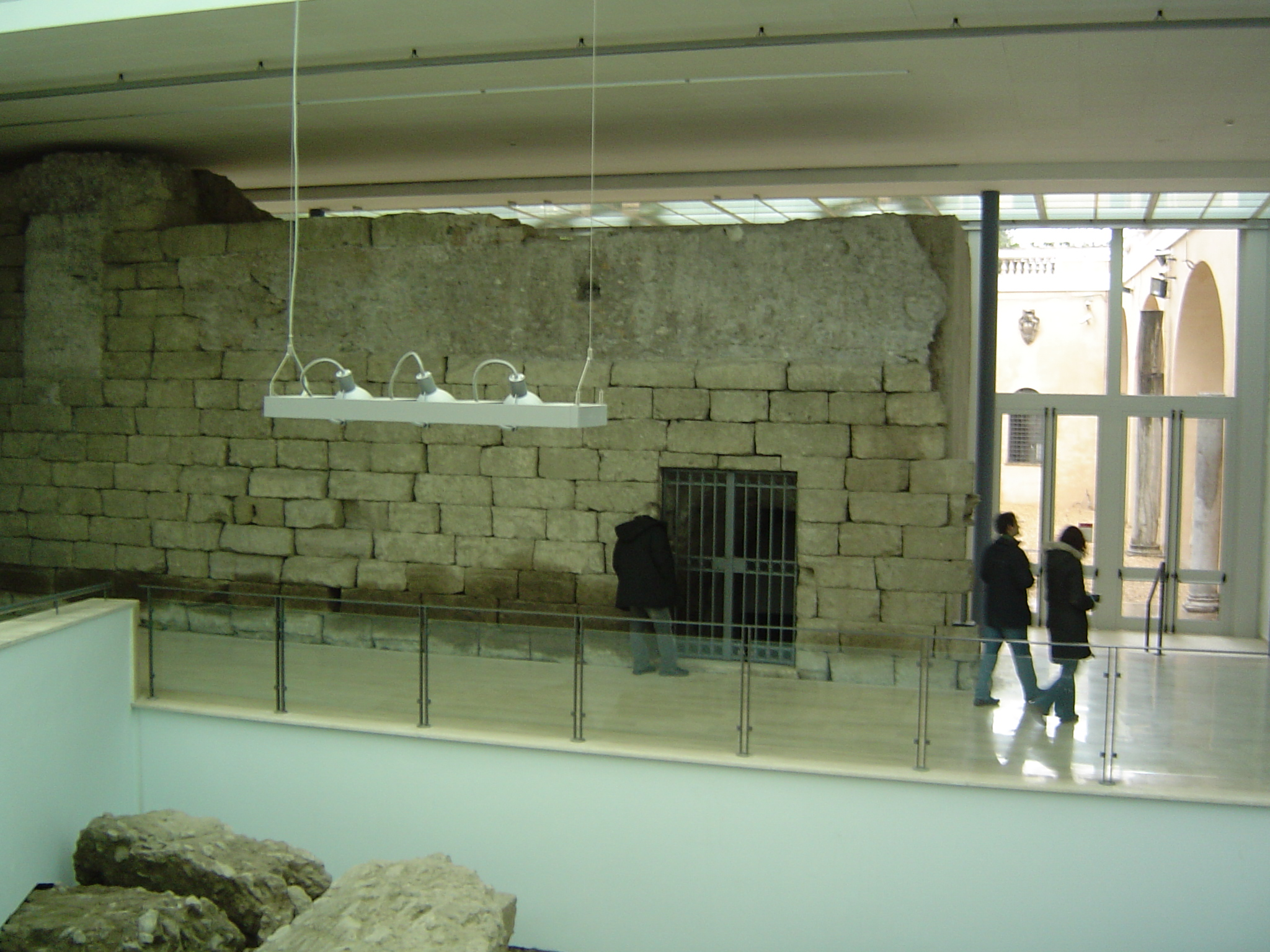
Podium wall in the basement of the Musei Capitolini

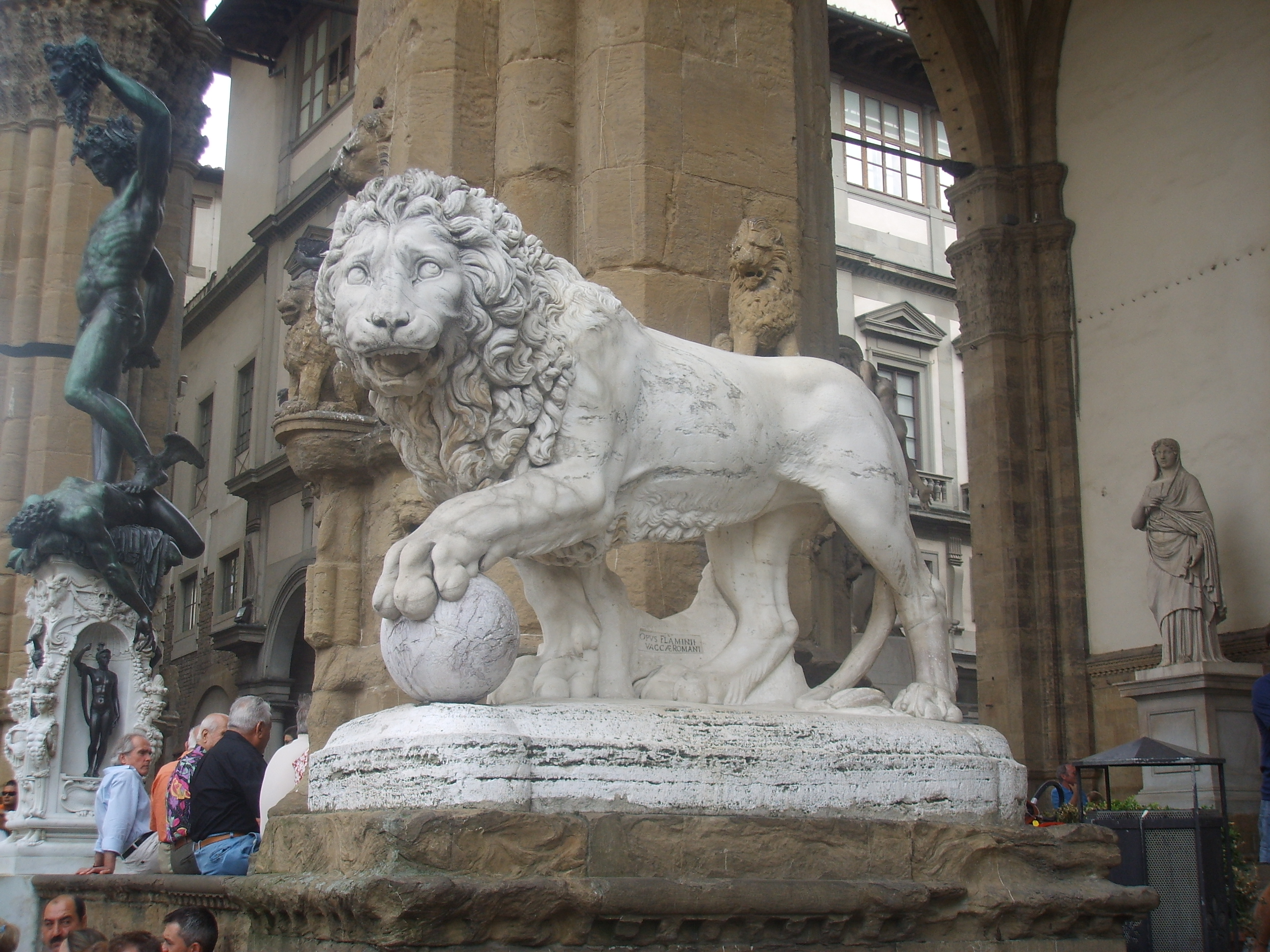
Vacca's lion

Today, portions of the temple podium and foundations can be seen behind the Palazzo dei Conservatori, in an exhibition area built in the Caffarelli Garden, and within the Musei Capitolini. A part of the eastern corner is also visible in the via del Tempio di Giove.

The second Medici lion was sculpted in the late 16th century by Flaminio Vacca from a capital from the Temple of Jupiter Optimus Maximus.

== Area Capitolina ==
The Area Capitolina was the precinct on the southern part of the Capitoline that surrounded the Temple of Jupiter, enclosing it with irregular retaining walls following the hillside contours. The precinct was enlarged in 388 BC, to about 3,000m^{2}. The Clivus Capitolinus ended at the main entrance in the center of the southeast side, and the Porta Pandana seems to have been a secondary entrance; these gates were closed at night. The sacred geese of Juno, said to have sounded the alarm during the Gallic siege of Rome, were kept in the Area, which was guarded during the Imperial period by dogs kept by a temple attendant. Domitian hid in the dog handler's living quarters when the forces of Vitellius overtook the Capitoline.

Underground chambers called favissae held damaged building materials, old votive offerings, and dedicated objects that were not suitable for display. It was religiously prohibited to disturb these. The precinct held numerous shrines, altars, statues, and victory trophies. Some plebeian and tribal assemblies met there. In late antiquity, it was a market for luxury goods, and continued as such into the medieval period: in a letter from 468, Sidonius Apollinaris describes a shopper negotiating over the price of gems, silk, and fine fabrics.

Capitoline Hill plan
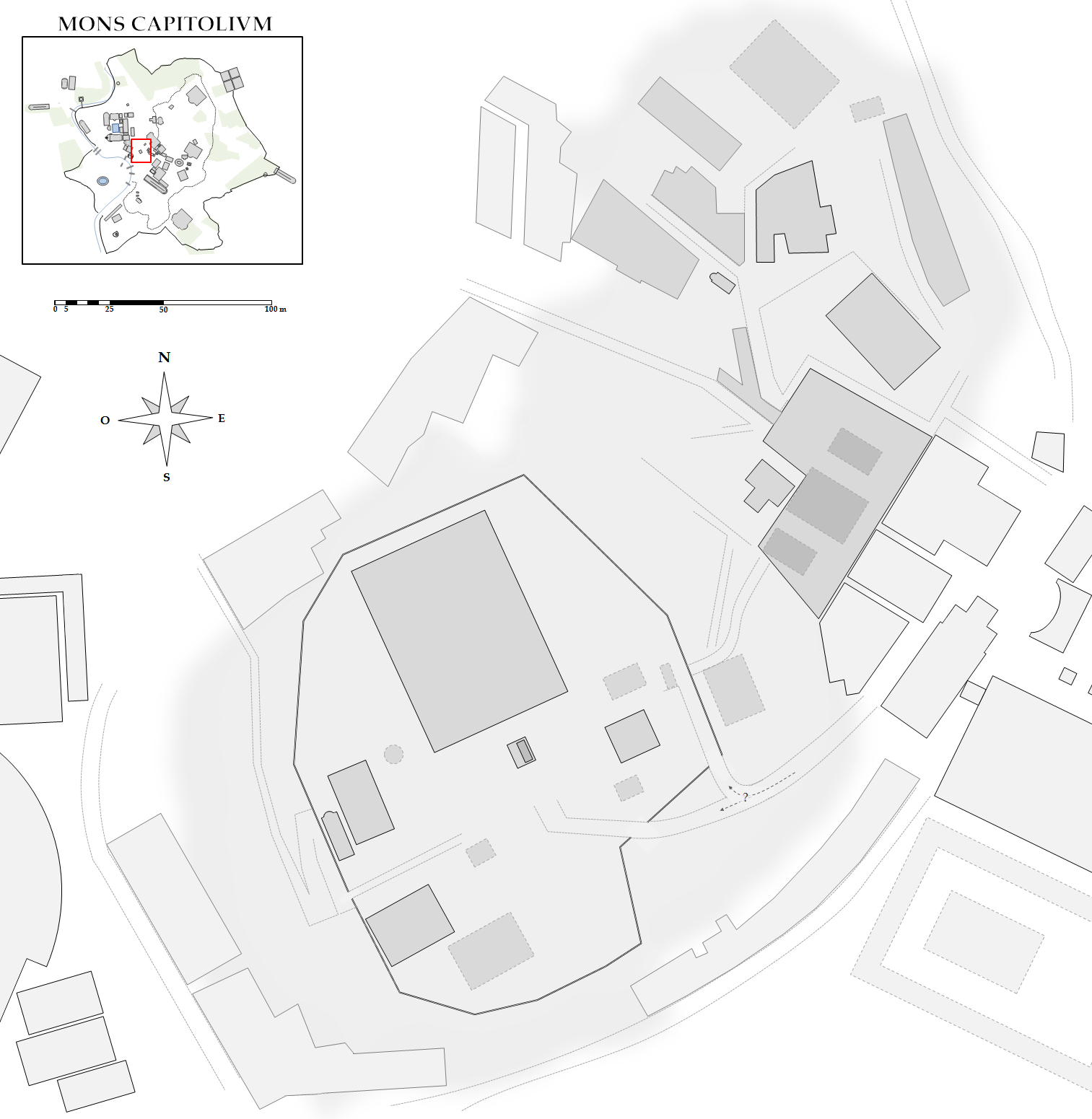

== See also ==
- List of Ancient Roman temples
