= Manlius Hurled From The Rock =

Painting by William Etty

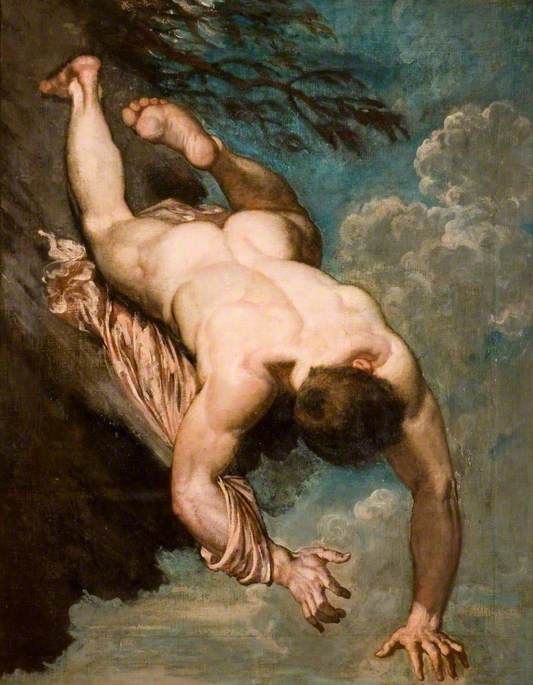
- Artist: William Etty
- Year: 1818
- Type: Oil on canvas, history painting
- Dimensions: 127.8 cm × 102.9 cm (50.3 in × 40.5 in)
- Location: Birmingham Museum and Art Gallery; West Midlands

Manlius Hurled From The Rock is an 1818 history painting by the British artist William Etty. It depicts a scene from Ancient Roman history. Marcus Manlius Capitolinus, a former Consul during the Roman Republic, was accused of treason and condemned to death despite his former heroism in defending the city from the Gauls. He is shown being hurled from the Tarpeian Rock by the Tribunes, a traditional punishment. As with much of Etty's work he combines nude art with history painting in the composition. He subsequently exhibited at the British Institution in Pall Mall.

Today the painting is in the collection of the Birmingham Museum and Art Gallery, having been acquired in 1967. In 2003 a preparatory oil sketch for the painting was auctioned at Christie's.

== Bibliography ==
- Robinson, Leonard. William Etty: The Life and Art. McFarland, 2007.
