= Aelius Saturninus =

Poet from the 1st century

- Died: ca. 23 AD
- Occupation: Poet
- Language: Latin
- Period: 1st century

Aelius Saturninus was a Roman 1st-century poet.

Little is known about Saturninus. Cassius Dio writes that he was executed by the Senate, sentenced to be dropped from the Tarpeian Rock on the charge of having recited some improper verses about Tiberius. It is presumed that Saturninus wrote these verses himself and so was a poet, but neither of these is recorded in Dio's account.
