= Empanda =

Roman goddess

In ancient Roman religion, Empanda or Panda was a goddess, or possibly an epithet of Juno.

Festus identifies her only as a dea paganorum, "goddess of the rustics." Varro associates her with Ceres, and notes that there is a Roman gate named after her, the Porta Pandana. A similarly named gate is mentioned in the Umbrian Iguvine Tablets (VIa 14): pertome Padellar. Varro connects the word with pandere, "to open," but also explains it by panem dare, "to give bread," so that Empanda would be the goddess of bread or food.

Modern scholarship associates the Latin Empanda with the Oscan Patanaí (in the dative singular), and the Umbrian Padellar (<*Padenla:s < *Patnla:s < *Patnola:s), with Latin -nd- regularly from *-tn-, and Oscan regular vowel insertion to break up consonant clusters. All are ultimately related to not only pando/pandere, but also to Latin pateo "I open" and ultimately from a Proto-Indo-European root *peth₂- "to spread" seen also in English fathom (originally meaning "outstretched arms").

Empanda had a sanctuary near the gate which led to the capitol and which was called the Porta Pandana after her. Her temple was an asylum which was always open. Needy supplicants who came to it were supplied with food from the resources of the temple. In the opinion of Leonhard Schmitz, this custom shows the meaning of the name Panda or Empanda: it is connected with pandere, to open; she is accordingly the goddess who is open to or admits any one who wants protection. Hartung thinks that Empanda and Panda are only surnames of Juno.
