= Castalian Spring =

Sacred fountain at Delphi

Coordinates: 38°28′59″N 22°30′20″E

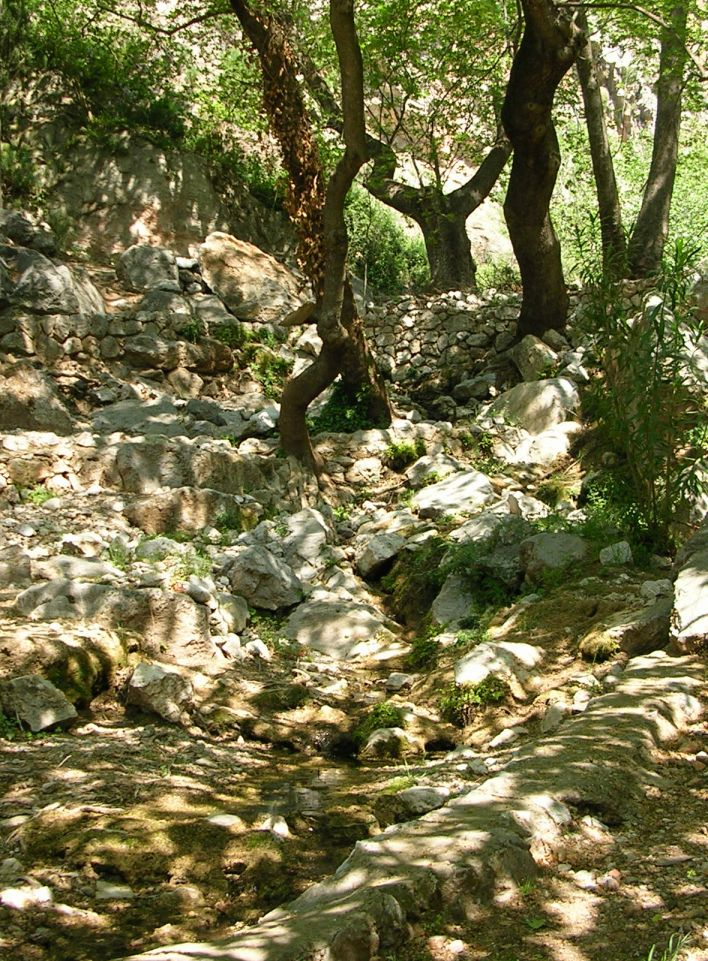
Castalian Spring

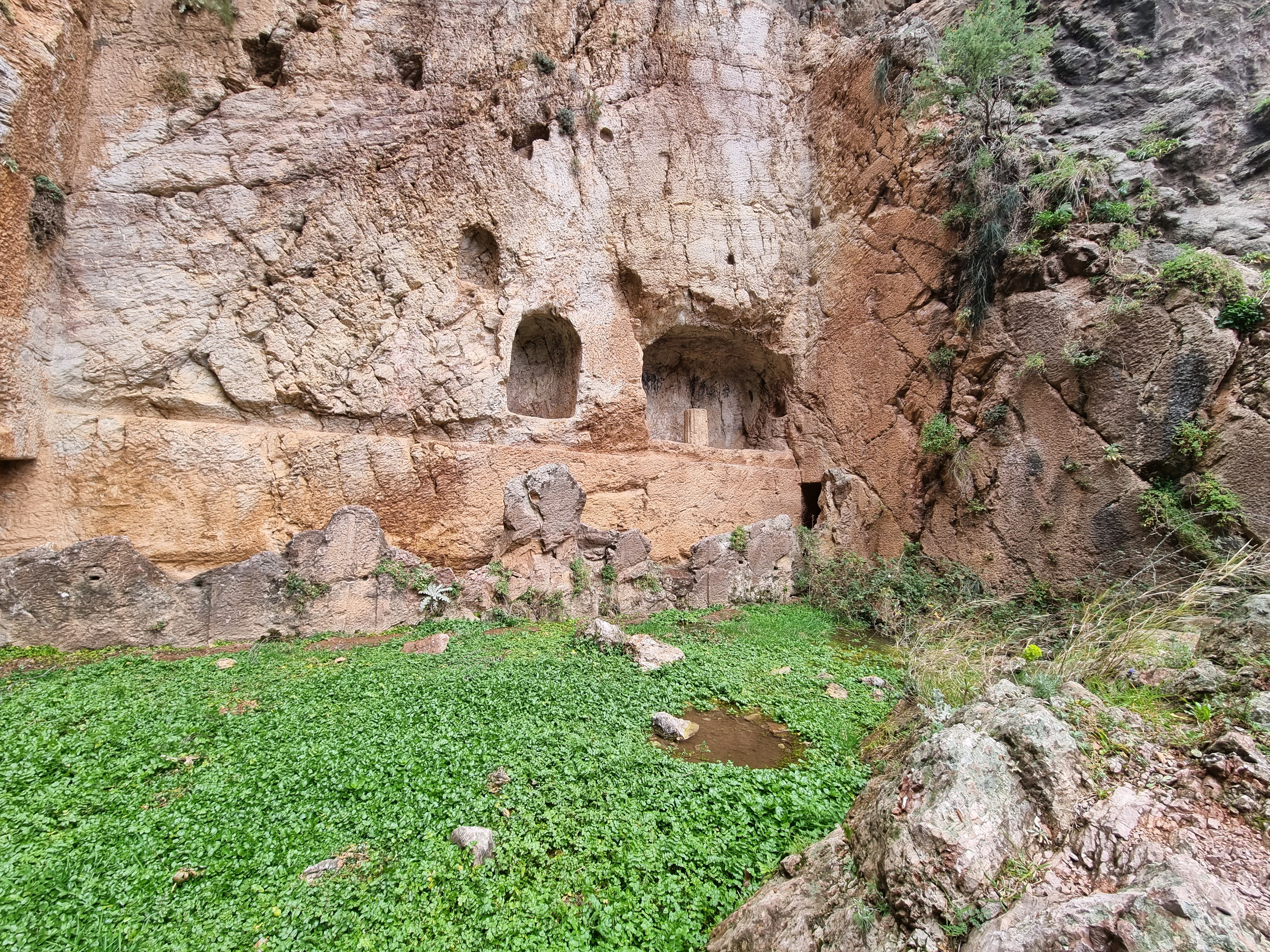
The Roman Fountain

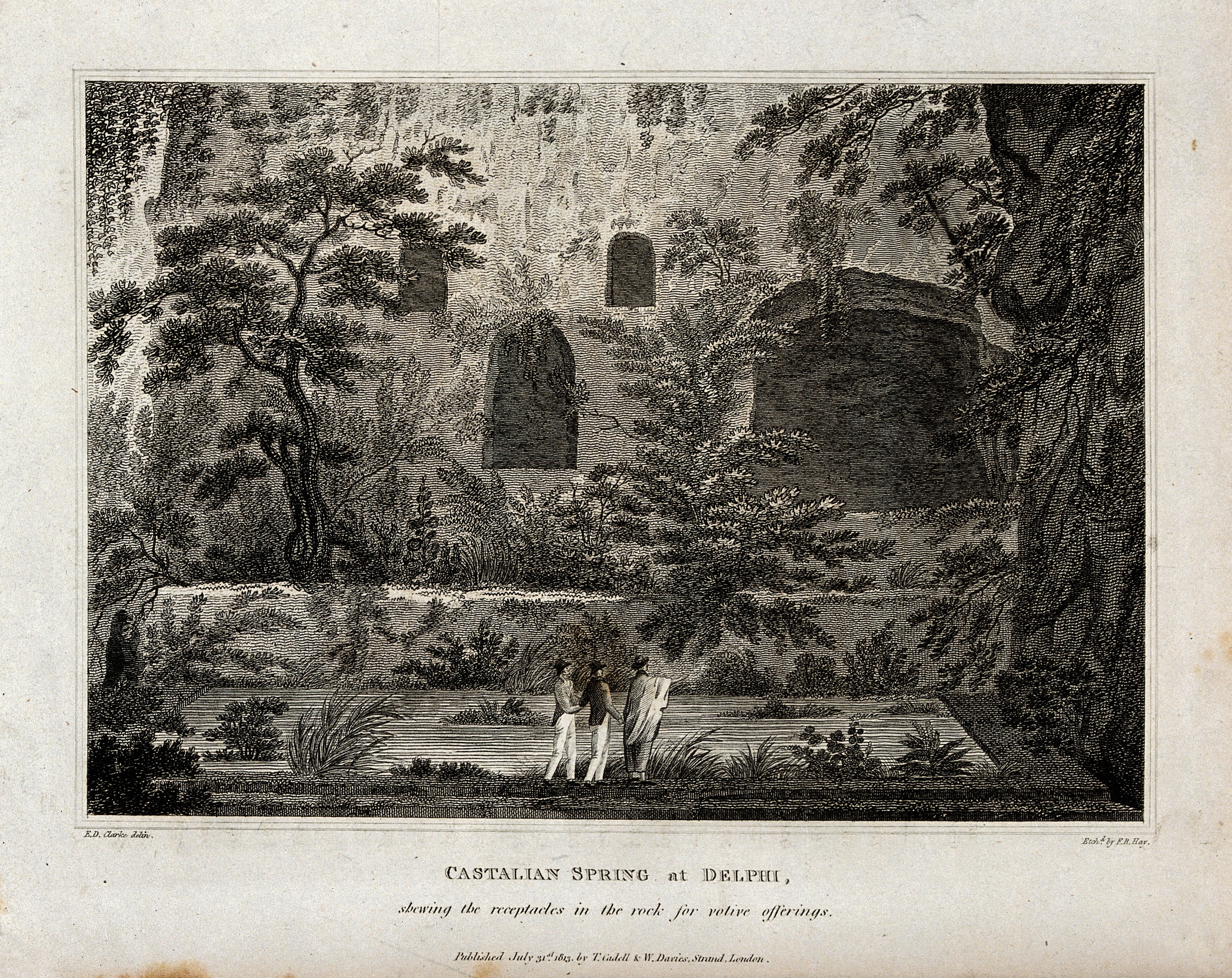
Print from Frederick Rudolph Hay etching of Edward Daniel Clarke's Castalian spring at Delphi

The Castalian Spring, in the ravine between the Phaedriades at Delphi, is where all visitors to Delphi — the contestants in the Pythian Games, and especially pilgrims who came to consult the Delphic Oracle — stopped to wash themselves and quench their thirst; it is also here that the Pythia and the priests cleansed themselves before the oracle-giving process. Finally Roman poets regarded it as a source of poetic inspiration. According to some mythological versions it was here that Apollo killed the monster, Python, who was guarding the spring, and that is why it was considered to be sacred.

== The Archaic fountain ==
Two fountains, which were fed by the sacred spring, still survive. The archaic 6th century BCE fountain house has a marble-lined basin surrounded by benches. Water was brought here by means of a short and small aqueduct and was distributed by a system of water pipes ending in lion-headed spouts.

== The Roman fountain ==
The Roman fountain dates to the 1st century B.C. and is situated about 50 meters higher than the Archaic one. Niches carved on the rock were intended for the ex votos of the pilgrims. One of them was later transformed into a church of St. John the Baptist. The water of the spring reached the fountain with a closed aqueduct. On the facade of the fountain there were seven bronze spouts. In front of it there was a paved courtyard with stone benches on its three sides.

== Aftermath and other uses ==
A modern fountain currently stands close to the street leading to the archaeological site of Delphi to offer respite to the travelers. The Castalian Spring fueled poetic inspiration, albeit often confused with the Spring of Pieris. The Castalian Band, a group of poets or makars associated with the Court of James VI of Scotland (including the king himself) drew their name from this source.

There is a town named Castalian Springs in Tennessee. A natural spring in this location was a gathering place for animals. Isaac Bledsoe discovered the spring in 1772. Having built a fort in 1783, Bledsoe, his brother, and their families settled near the spring in 1787. Native Americans killed the two brothers, who are now buried 500 yards northwest of the spring. Consequently, this area was known locally as Bledsoe's Lick. In 1828, a log inn was built, providing guests with "healthy" drinking water and mineral baths. Almost ten years later when the post office was built, the community changed its name from Bledsoe's Lick to Castalian Springs. During this period of time in history, there was a reawakening of interest in classical Greece and Rome.

In Castalia, Ohio, named after the famed site, the Blue Hole limestone configurations were tourist attractions for many years and are now fish hatcheries. Waters in the blue holes are of a constant temperature and never freeze over despite northern Ohio's cold temperatures. The water which averages 30,000 gallons an hour was first used to supply a local mill.

Castalian Springs was the name of a now-abandoned spa near Durant, Mississippi.

== See also ==
- Castalia
