= Phaedriades =

Pair of cliffs on Mount Parnassos, Greece

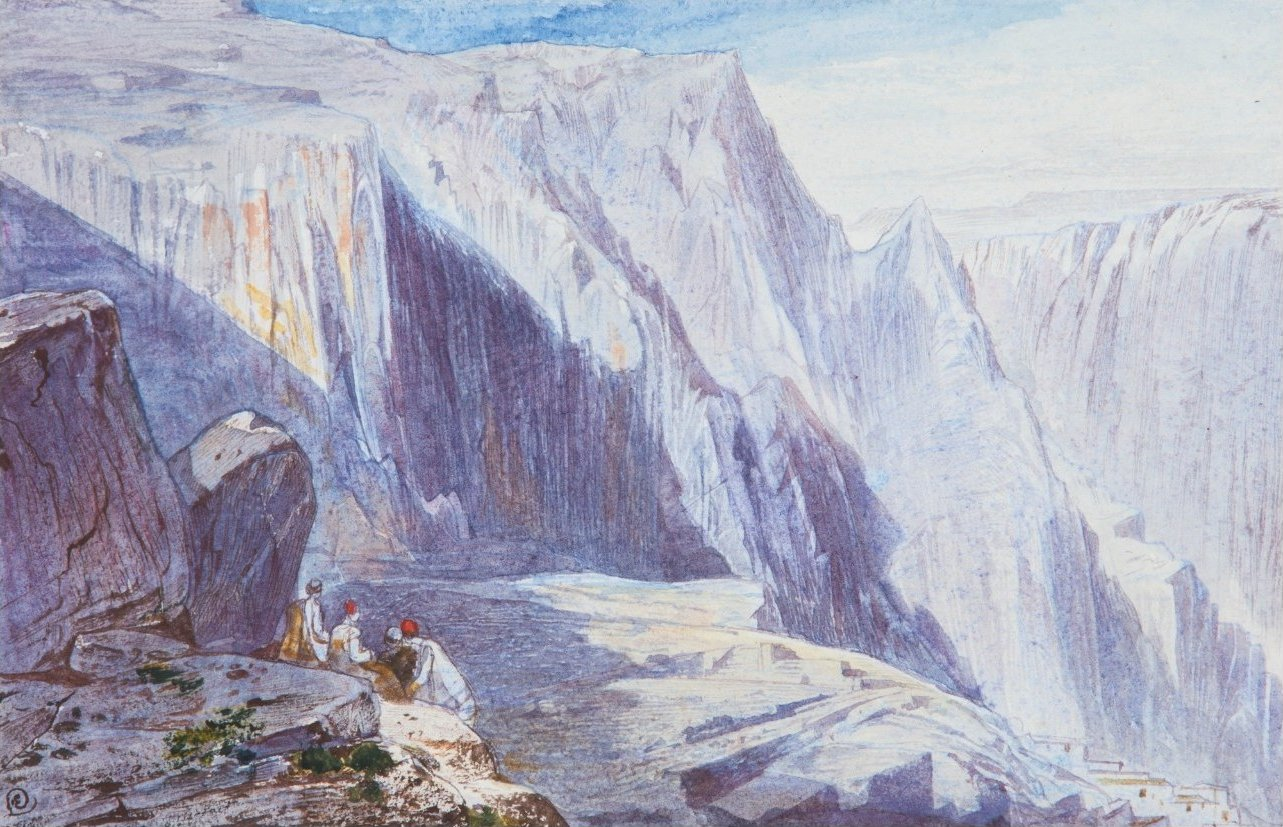
'Delphi' by Edward Lear, watercolor, 12 by 19 cm..

In Greece, the Phaedriades (Φαιδριάδες, meaning "the shining ones") are the pair of cliffs, ca 700 m high on the lower southern slope of Mt. Parnassos, which rise above the sacred site of Delphi. Strabo, Plutarch and Pausanias all mentioned the Phaedriades when describing the site, a narrow valley of the Pleistos (today Xeropotamos) formed by Parnassos and Mount Cirphis. Between them rises the Castalian Spring. Even nowadays, at noontime, the rock surfaces reflect a dazzling glare.

== Geology ==
The Phaedriades consist of dark limestone formed in the Jurassic period.

== Historical narrations ==
Herodotus mentions that during the Persian invasion of Greece in 480 B.C. Apollo sent an oracle to the priests of Delphi saying that he would defend his sacred site himself. The priests thus refused the offer of the Athenians to help. Indeed, as the Persian army approached, thunderbolts fell from the sky and killed several of the enemy. Defensive weapons appeared magically in front of the temple of Apollo and of that of Athena Pronaia. Finally, as the Persians reached the Phaedriades, boulders cleaved from the cliffs and, without hitting the monuments and the sacred site, fell on the Persians and crushed them. Herodotus mentions that in his day, one could see these rocks embedded in the ground within the sacred precinct of Athena Pronaia.

It is also claimed that in antiquity, those who committed sacrilege against the sanctuary were thrown from the cliffs.
