= Porta Pandana =

The Porta Pandana (also known as the Porta Saturnia) was an ancient Roman gateway in the original fortifications of the Capitoline Hill.

According to Festus, this gate was the one through which Tarpeia allowed the Sabines to enter the city of Rome. In a treaty signed between Romans and the Sabines, this gate was stipulated to remain open. Other ancient authors who mentioned this gate included Polyaenus, who described the Gauls utilising it during their sack of Rome in 390 BCE, while Dionysius of Halicarnassus mentions this gate during the assault of Appius Herdonius on the Capitol, but mistakenly referred to it as the Porta Carmentalis.

It has been surmised that the gate’s most likely location would have been above the Tarpeian Rock, as at that point the terrain would have made accessing the open gate difficult. The gate seems to have survived through to the 1st century BCE as it is mentioned by Marcus Terentius Varro, but would not have survived the monumental rebuilding programs of the emperors during the imperial period.
