= List of paintings by Jacques-Louis David =

Below is a list of selected paintings by the French artist Jacques-Louis David.

Image	Title	Date	Technique	Size (см)	Location	Note
	Portrait of François Buron	1769	oil on canvas	65 × 54	Unidentified location	
	Portrait of Madame François Buron	1769	oil on canvas	66 × 55	Art Institute of Chicago	
	Portrait of Marie-Françoise Buron	1769	oil on canvas	66 × 54	National Museum of Fine Arts of Algiers	
	Minerva Fighting Mars	1771	oil on canvas	114 × 140	Louvre Museum, Paris	
	Jupiter and Antiope	1771	oil on canvas	87 × 79	Musées de Sens, Sens, France	
	Diana and Apollo Killing Niobe's Children	1772	oil on canvas	120.65 × 153.67	Dallas Museum of Art, Dallas, Texas	
	The Death of Seneca	1773	oil on canvas	122 × 155	Petit Palais, Paris	
	Erasistratus Discovering the Cause of Antiochus' Disease	1774	oil on canvas	120 × 155	École nationale supérieure des Beaux-Arts, Paris	
	Hector	1778	oil on canvas	123 × 172	Fabre Museum, Montpellier	
	The Funeral Games of Patroclus	1778	oil on canvas	94 × 218	National Gallery of Ireland, Dublin	
	Ancient Philosopher	1779	oil on canvas	74 × 64	Museum of Baron Gerard, Bayeux, France	
	Saint Jerome Hears the Trumpet of the Last Judgment	1779	oil on canvas	174 × 124	Musée de la civilisation, Quebec	
	Patroclus	1780	oil on canvas	122 × 170	Musée Thomas-Henry, Cherbourg-Octeville, France	
	Saint Roch Interceding with the Virgin for the Plague-Stricken	1780	oil on canvas	260 × 195	Museum of Fine Arts, Marseille	
	Young Woman with a Turban	1780	oil on canvas	55 × 46	Cleveland Museum of Art, Cleveland, Ohio	
	Portrait of Count Stanislas Potocki	1781	oil on canvas	304 × 218	Museum of the Palace of King John III in Wilanow, Warsaw	
	Belisarius Begging for Alms	1781	oil on canvas	288 × 312	Palais des Beaux-Arts de Lille, France	
	Christ on the Cross	1782	oil on canvas	276 × 188	Church of St Vincent, Mâcon, France	
	Portrait of Jacques-François Desmaisons	1782	oil on canvas	91.44 x 72.39	Albright–Knox Art Gallery, Buffalo	
	Andromache Mourning Hector	1783	oil on canvas	275 × 203	Louvre Museum, Paris	
	The Vestal Virgin	1783	oil on canvas		private collection	
	Portrait of Alphonse Leroy	1783	oil on canvas	72 × 91	Fabre Museum, Montpellier	
	Portrait of Charles Pierre Pecoul	1784	oil on canvas	91.5 × 72.5	Musée du Louvre, Paris	
	Portrait of Geneviève Jacqueline Pecoul	1784	oil on canvas	92 × 72	Musée du Louvre, Paris	
	Belisarius Begging for Alms	1784	oil on canvas	101 × 115	Musée du Louvre, Paris	
	Oath of the Horatii	1784–1785	oil on canvas	330 × 425	Louvre Museum, Paris	
	The Death of Socrates	1787	oil on canvas	130 × 196	Metropolitan Museum of Art, New York	
	The Loves of Paris and Helen	1788	oil on canvas	147 × 180	Musée des Arts Décoratifs, Paris	
	The Loves of Paris and Helen (study)	1788	oil on canvas		National Museum of Fine Arts of Algiers	
	Portrait of Antoine-Laurent Lavoisier and his wife	1788	oil on canvas	260 × 195	Metropolitan Museum of Art, New York	
	The Lictors Bring to Brutus the Bodies of His Sons	1789	oil on canvas	330 × 450	Louvre Museum, Paris	
	Portrait of Philippe-Laurent de Joubert	1790–92	oil on canvas	127 × 96	Musée Fabre, Montpellier	
	Portrait of Anne-Marie-Louise Thélusson, Countess of Sorcy	1790	oil on canvas	129 × 97	Neue Pinakothek, Munich, Germany	
	Portrait of the Marquise d'Orvilliers	1790	oil on canvas	131 × 98	Louvre Museum, Paris	
	Lycurgus of Sparta	1791	oil on canvas		Musée des Beaux-Arts, Blois	
	Self-portrait	1791	oil on canvas	64 × 53	Uffizi, Florence	
	Portrait of Madame Pastoret	1791–92	oil on canvas	130 × 97	Art Institute of Chicago, Chicago	
	Portrait of Madame Marie-Louise Trudaine	1791–1792	oil on canvas	130 × 98	Louvre Museum, Paris	
	Portrait of flautist François Devienne	1792	oil on canvas	75 × 59.5	Royal Museums of Fine Arts of Belgium, Brussels	
	Antoinette Gabrielle Charpentier Danton	1793	oil on canvas	64.7 × 55.6	Musée des beaux-arts de Troyes, Troyes, France	
	The Death of Marat	1793	oil on canvas	162 × 125	Royal Museums of Fine Arts of Belgium	
	Self-portrait	1794	oil on canvas	81 × 64	Louvre Museum, Paris	
	The Last Moments of Michel Lepeletier	1793			Lost	
	The Death of Young Bara	1794	oil on canvas	118 × 155	Calvet Museum, Avignon, France	
	View of the Luxembourg Gardens	1794	oil on canvas	55 × 65	Louvre Museum, Paris	
	Portrait of Pierre Sériziat	1795	oil on canvas	131 × 96	Louvre Museum, Paris	
	Portrait of Jacobus Blauw	1795	oil on canvas	92 × 73	National Gallery, London	
	Psyche Abandoned	1795	oil on canvas		private collection	
	Unfinished portrait of General Bonaparte	1799	oil on canvas	81 × 65	Louvre Museum, Paris	
	The Intervention of the Sabine Women	1799	oil on canvas	385 × 522	Louvre Museum, Paris	
	Portrait of Henriette de Verninac	1799	oil on canvas	145.5 × 112	Louvre Museum, Paris	
	Portrait of Madame Récamier	1800	oil on canvas	174 × 244	Louvre Museum, Paris	
	Portrait of a Young Woman	1800	oil on canvas	75.5 × 57.5	Fogg Museum, Cambridge, Massachusetts	
	Napoleon at the Saint-Bernard Pass	1801	oil on canvas	261 × 220	Château de Malmaison, Paris	
	Portrait of Cooper Penrose	1802	oil on canvas	130.5 × 97.5	Timken Museum of Art, San Diego	
	Napoleon in Imperial Costume	1805	oil on canvas	58 × 49	Palais des Beaux-Arts de Lille, Lille, France	
	Pope Pius VII and Cardinal Caprara	1805	oil on canvas	138 × 96	Philadelphia Museum of Art, Philadelphia	
	Portrait of Pope Pius VII	1805	oil on wood	86 × 71	Louvre Museum, Paris	
	The Coronation of Napoleon	1806–07	oil on canvas	621 × 979	Louvre Museum, Paris	
	Sappho and Phaon	1808	oil on canvas	225,3 × 262	Hermitage Museum, St Petersburg, Russia	
	The Coronation of Napoleon (copy of 1806–07 painting)	1808–1822	oil on canvas	610 × 971	Museum of the History of France, Versailles	
	The Distribution of the Eagle Standards	1810	oil on canvas	610 × 931	Versailles, France	
	Portrait of comte Antoine Français de Nantes	1811	oil on panel	114 × 75	Musée Jacquemart-André, Paris	
	The Emperor Napoleon in His Study at the Tuileries	1812	oil on canvas	204 × 125	National Gallery of Art, Washington D.C.	
	The Three Women of Gand	1812	oil on canvas	132 × 105	Louvre Museum, Paris	
	Portrait of Madame David	1813	oil on canvas	73 × 60	National Gallery of Art, Washington D.C.	
	Apelles Painting Campaspe in the Presence of Alexander the Great	1814	oil on canvas	96.5 × 136	Palais des Beaux-Arts de Lille, Lille, France	
	Leonidas at Thermopylae	1814	oil on canvas	395 × 531	Louvre Museum, Paris	
	Portrait of Étienne Maurice Gérard	1816	oil on canvas	197 × 136	Metropolitan Museum of Art, New York	
	Portrait of the Countess Vilain XIIII and her Daughter Louise	1816	oil on canvas	95 × 76	National Gallery, London	
	Cupid and Psyche	1817	oil on canvas	184 × 241	Cleveland Museum of Art, Cleveland, Ohio	
	The Farewell of Telemachus and Eucharis	1818	oil on canvas	88 × 103	Getty Center, Los Angeles	
	Portrait of the Actor Wolf	1818–1823	oil on canvas	125 × 85	Louvre Museum, Paris	
	The Anger of Achilles	1818	oil on canvas	105 × 145	Kimbell Art Museum, Fort Worth, Texas	
	The Sisters Zénaïde and Charlotte Bonaparte	1821	oil on canvas	130 × 101	Getty Center, Los Angeles	
	Mars Being Disarmed by Venus	1822–1825	oil on canvas	308 × 265	Royal Museums of Fine Arts of Belgium, Brussels	
	Portrait of Juliette de Villeneuve	1824	oil on canvas		Louvre Museum, Paris	
	Roman Youth with Horse	1824	oil on canvas	92 × 74	Detroit Institute of Arts, Detroit	
	Roman Warrior	1824	oil on canvas	93 × 74	Detroit Institute of Arts, Detroit	
