= Jupiter and Antiope (David) =

Painting by Jacques-Louis David

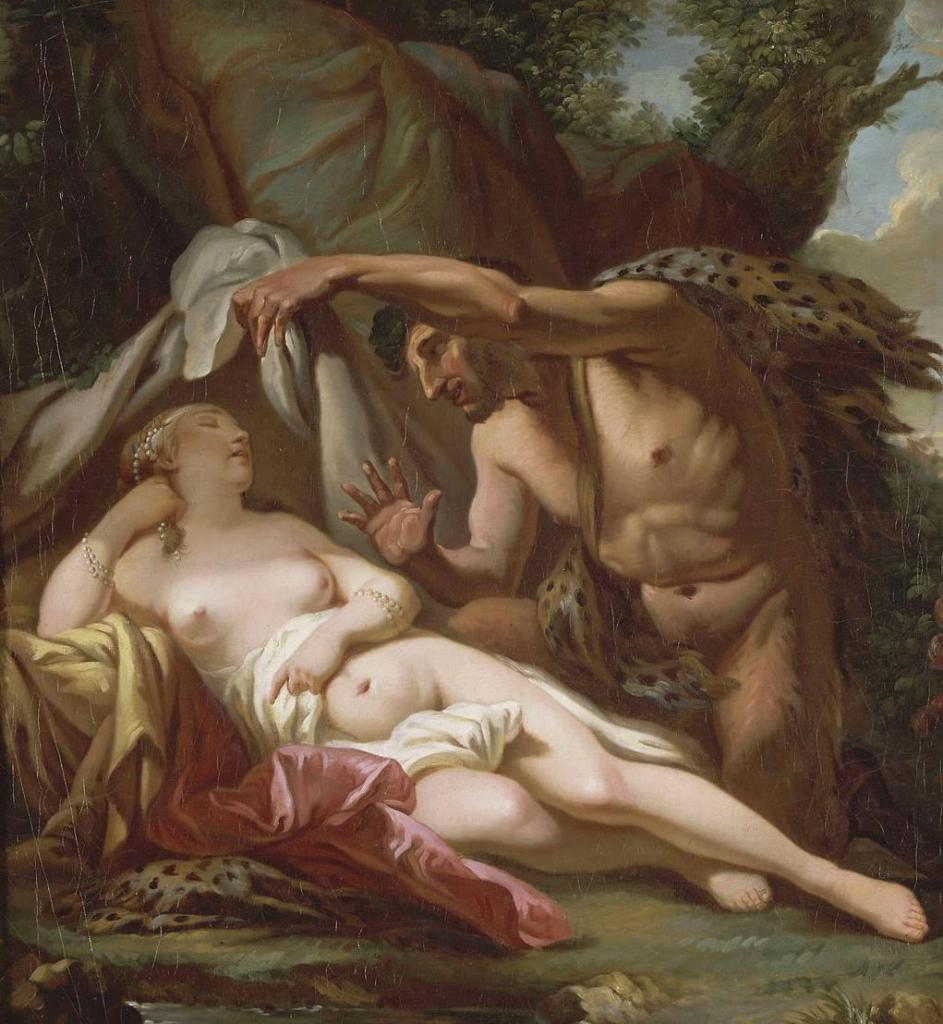
- Artist: Jacques-Louis David
- Year: 1771
- Medium: Oil on canvas
- Dimensions: 87 cm × 79 cm (34 in × 31 in)
- Location: Musées de Sens, France

Jupiter and Antiope is a painting of unknown date, showing Jupiter and Antiope. On the reverse is a sketch of a young woman. It is possibly attributed to the French painter Jacques-Louis David, though the attribution is difficult since David disowned most of the works he produced as a young man.

David gave this painting to his cousin Marie-Françoise Baudry and her husband. Her grandson Adolphe Guillon left it to the musée de Sens on his death in 1896 where it is now held. It was published in 1911 by Charles Saunier.

== See also ==
- List of paintings by Jacques-Louis David

== Bibliography ==
- Jupiter et Antiope, in David, catalogue d’exposition du musée du Louvre, Paris, Éditions de la Réunion des musées nationaux, 1989.
