= The Vestal Virgin =

Painting by Jacques-Louis David

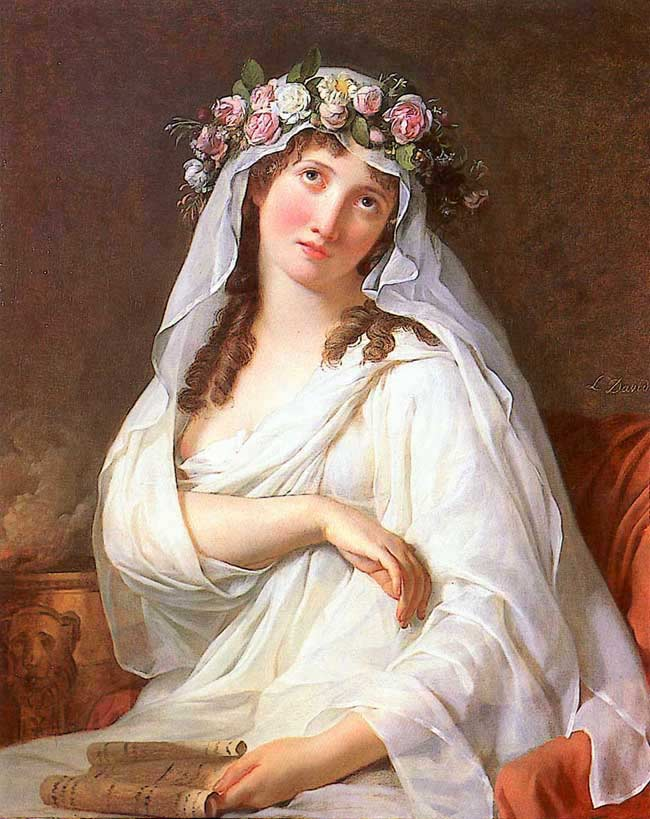
- Artist: Jacques-Louis David
- Year: c. 1783 – c. 1787
- Medium: Oil on canvas
- Location: private collection

The Vestal Virgin is an oil-on-canvas painting by the French artist Jacques-Louis David. Its date is unknown, but Antoine Schnapper estimates it between 1784 and 1787, because 1787 was the year given for it in the 1803 Lespinasse sale catalogue. Sophie Monneret suggests 1783, the same year as Andromache Mourning Hector, perhaps in response to the creation of the Prix de Vertu.

It is a half-length study of a vestal virgin and was rediscovered in 1909. Its attribution to David was contested by Gaston Brière, Klaus Holma and Louis Hautecœur, although the work is signed and mentioned in the painter's own list of works. Antoine Schnapper believed that David's authorship was evident in the painting's treatment of the figure's hand and robe. Since the 1980s the painting has been in a private collection in the United States.

== See also ==
- List of paintings by Jacques-Louis David

== Bibliography ==
- Louis Hautecœur, Louis David, Paris, La Table Ronde, 1954
- Antoine Schnapper (ed.) and Arlette Sérullaz, Jacques-Louis David 1748–1825: catalogue de l'exposition rétrospective Louvre-Versailles 1989-1990, Paris, Réunion des Musées nationaux, 1989 (ISBN 2711823261), page 160
- Sophie Monneret, David et le néoclassicisme, Paris, Terrail, 1998 (ISBN 2879391865), page 68
