= Sappho and Phaon =

Painting by Jacques-Louis David

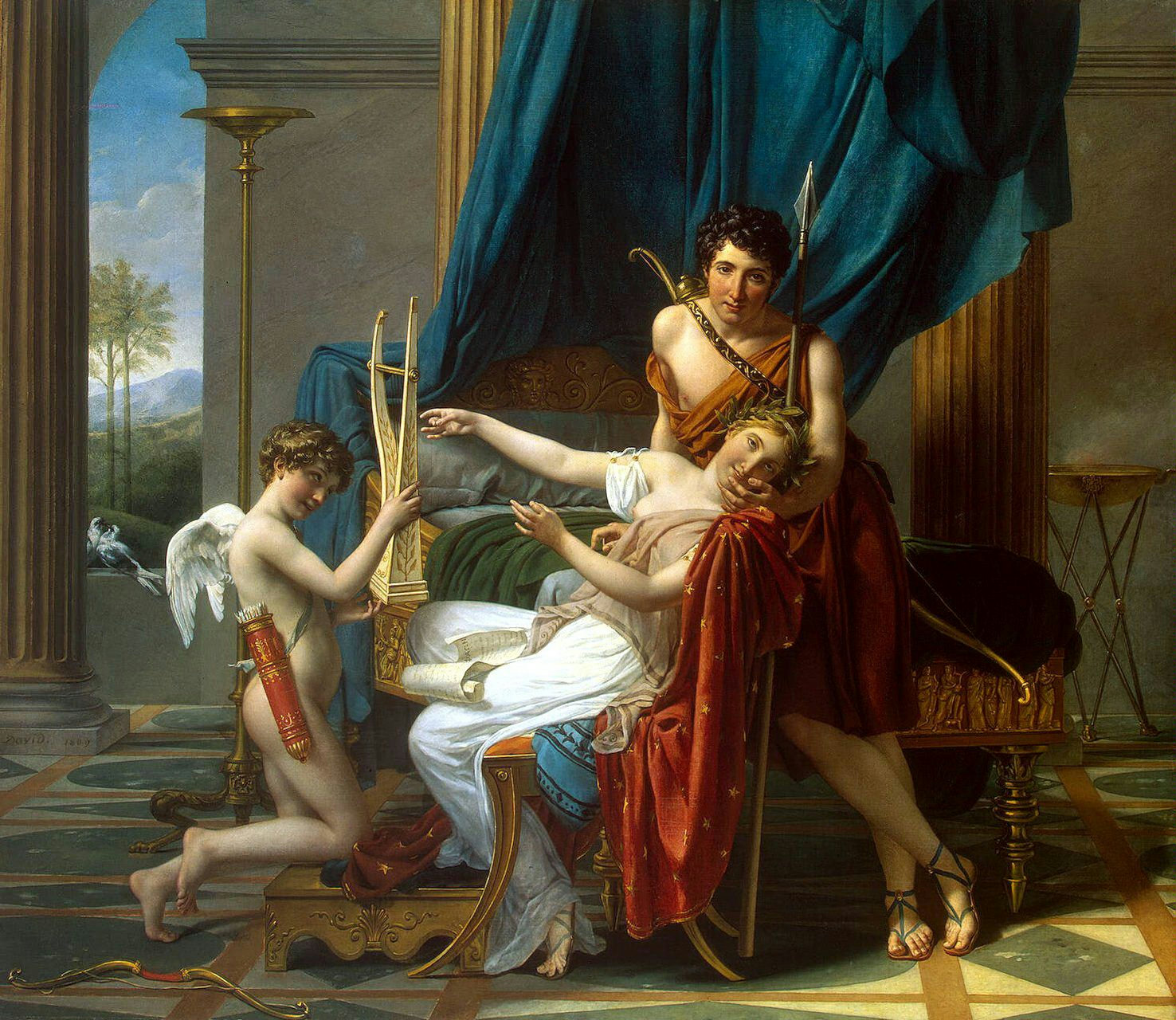
- Artist: Jacques-Louis David
- Year: 1809
- Medium: oil on canvas
- Dimensions: 225.3 cm × 262 cm (88.7 in × 103 in)
- Location: Hermitage Museum; Saint Petersburg

Sappho and Phaon is an 1809 neoclassical painting by the French painter Jacques-Louis David of Cupid, Sappho and her lover Phaon. It was commissioned by Prince Nikolai Yusupov for his Moika Palace and is now the only painting by David in the Hermitage Museum in Saint Petersburg.

Sappho and Phaon was the second of David's major paintings to take a mythological love story as its subject, after The Loves of Paris and Helen from 1788. It is visually very similar to that earlier work – the two paintings are sufficiently similar that a preparatory drawing for Sappho and Phaon was traditionally identified as being a sketch for Paris and Helen. It may also have recalled the painting Sappho Singing her Poetry and Accompanying Herself on the Lyre by David's painting tutor Joseph-Marie Vien, though that painting is now lost and no images of it survive.

Sappho is shown sitting in a chair at the foot of a bed in a classically decorated room with columns, a marble floor and a view to a rural landscape outside (with Venus's birds, doves, sitting on the doorstep). Phaon stands behind the chair holding a spear and bow. On her knee is a scroll with some of her verses in praise of Phaon and Cupid kneels in front of her, holding up her lyre, which she tries to play with her right hand whilst leaning her head back to let Phaon cradle her head in his left arm.

== See also ==
- List of paintings by Jacques-Louis David

== Works cited ==
- "Collection Highlights: Sappho and Phaon". The State Hermitage Museum. Archived from the original on 13 February 2009.
- Johnson, Dorothy (1997). Jacques-Louis David: The Farewell of Telemachus and Eucharis. Getty Publications. ISBN 9780892362363.
- Johnson, Dorothy (2006). Jacques-Louis David: New Perspectives. University of Delaware Press. ISBN 9780874139303.
