= The Death of Seneca =

Painting by Jacques-Louis David

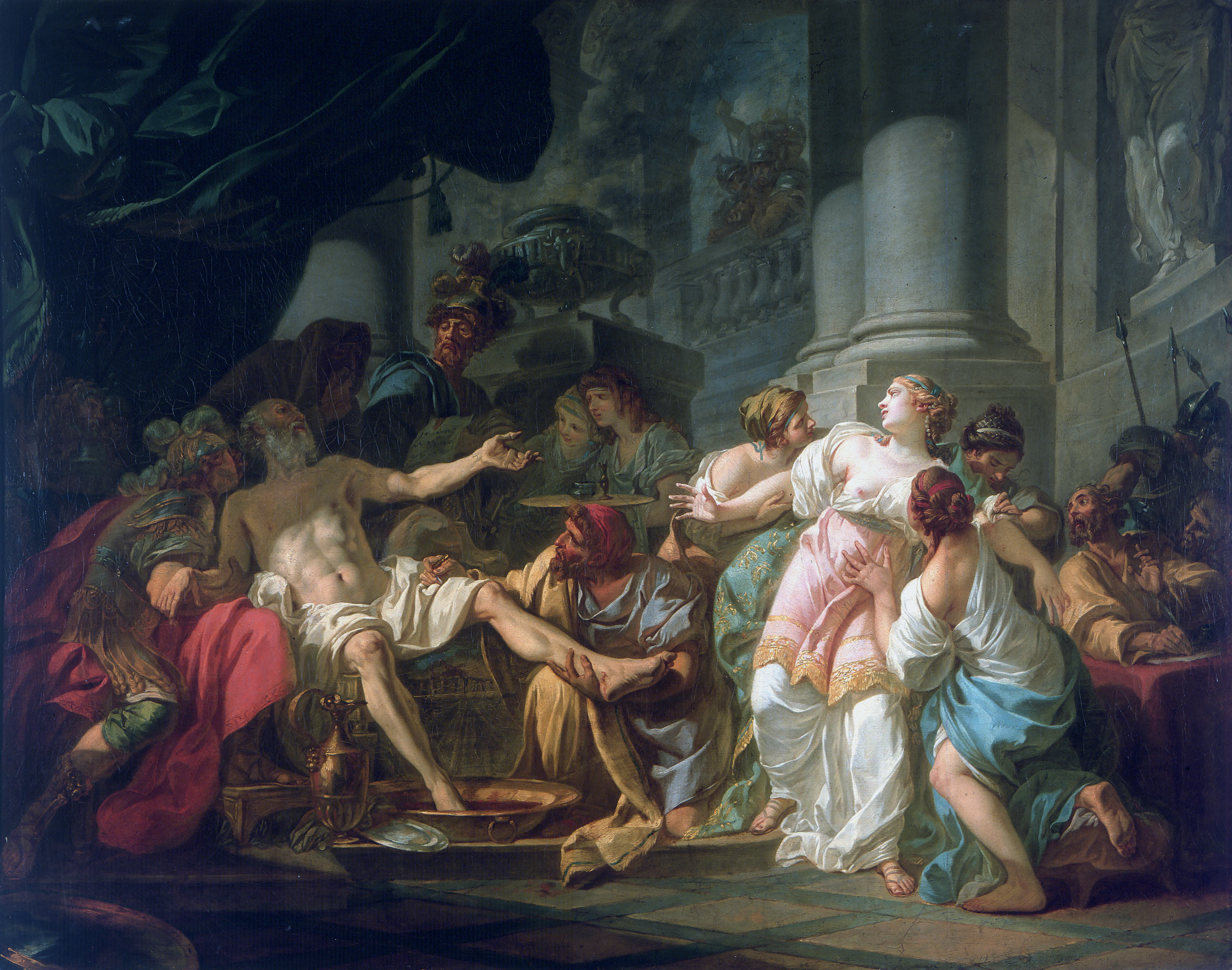
- Artist: Jacques-Louis David
- Year: 1773
- Medium: Oil on canvas
- Dimensions: 122 cm × 155 cm (48 in × 61 in)
- Location: Petit Palais, Paris

The Death of Seneca is a 1773 oil-on-canvas painting by the French artist Jacques-Louis David, now at the Petit Palais in Paris. It shows the suicide of Seneca the Younger. With its Boucher-like assembly of gesticulating figures, it was his third attempt to win the Prix de Rome, but lost to a painting on the same subject by Pierre Peyron. Peyron's had fewer details and a darker colour palette and was closer to the 'antique'. He was not only David's rival, but also initiated the new classicism which partly inspired David to produce his 1774 Erasistratus Discovering the Cause of Antiochus' Disease.

== Description ==
The Roman stoic philosopher, Seneca is shown having accepted the sentence passed down on him by the emperor Nero despite the fact that it was unjustly ordered. His wife, Paulina, pictured on the right, as she is taken away while unsuccessfully attempting the same fate, Paulina was prevented at Nero’s command once she herself was already unconscious.

After having his veins in his arms cut, an act reported by Tacitus as a “prolonged period of suffering” followed. To hasten his demise Seneca requests ankles to be also cut while his friend and doctor Statius Annaeus gives him a dose of hemlock. In events that followed the scene depicted in the painting, Seneca still alive suffering, is taken to a hot bath where he finally succumbs to his injuries.

Other figures in the piece include a centurion dispatched by Nero to witness the death and a disciple of who writes down the last words of the philosopher. These last words, as reported by Tacitus in The Annals Book XV, were “You see,” he said, “that I am not at liberty to requite your services with the last marks of my esteem. One thing, however, still remains. I leave you the example of my life, the best and most precious legacy now in my power. Cherish it in your memory, and you will gain at once the applause due to virtue, and the fame of a sincere and generous friendship.”

The lavish Rococo composition is in contrast with the austerity of the subject set by the Academy for the Grand Prix de Rome “the death of Seneca as told by Tacitus”. The jury was not convinced by David’s painting awarding the prize to Jean-François Pierre Peyron and this failure was his third, and penultimate, Prix de Rome submission winning the prize the following year.

== See also ==
- List of paintings by Jacques-Louis David

== Bibliography ==
- Régis Michel and Marie-Catherine Sahut, David, l'art et le politique, Paris, Gallimard, coll. « Découvertes Gallimard » (n° 46), 1988 (ISBN 2-07-053068-X)
