= Portrait of Juliette de Villeneuve =

Painting by Jacques-Louis David

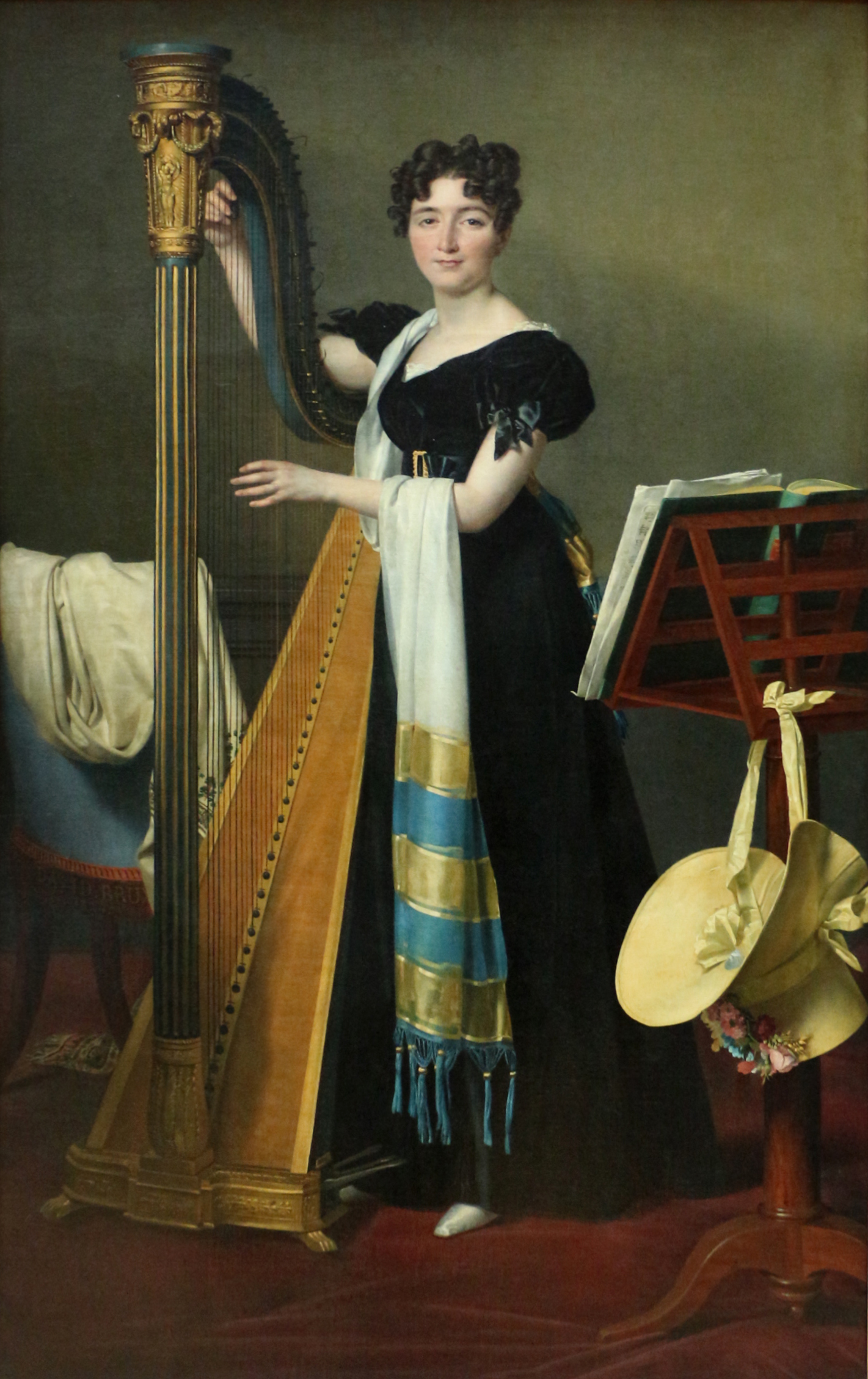
- Artist: Jacques-Louis David
- Year: 1824
- Type: Oil on canvas, portrait painting
- Dimensions: 197 cm × 123 cm (78 in × 48 in)
- Location: Louvre; Lens. Galerie du temps

Portrait of Juliette de Villeneuve is an 1824 portrait painting by the French artist Jacques-Louis David. It depicts a young woman Juliette de Villeneuve posing with a harp. David went into permanent exile in Brussels following the downfall of Napoleon and the Bourbon Restoration. This was the last original painting he produced before his death. The only subsequent work he created was a replica of his earlier The Anger of Achilles.

Juliette de Villeneuve (1802–1840) was part of the group of Napoleonic exiles who had taken shelter in Brussels, then part of the United Kingdom of the Netherlands. She was the niece of Julie Clary, the wife of Joseph Bonaparte the former king of Spain. These exiles provided most of the commissions David undertook in his final years. He received 6,000 francs as payment from the sitter's mother.

The painting is now in the Louvre in Lens, which acquired it in 1997.

== See also ==
- List of paintings by Jacques-Louis David

== Bibliography ==
- Ausoni, Alberto. Music in Art. J. Paul Getty Museum, 2009.
- Bordes, Phillipe. Jacques-Louis David: Empire to Exile. Yale University Press, 2007.
