= Minerva Fighting Mars =

Painting by Jacques-Louis David

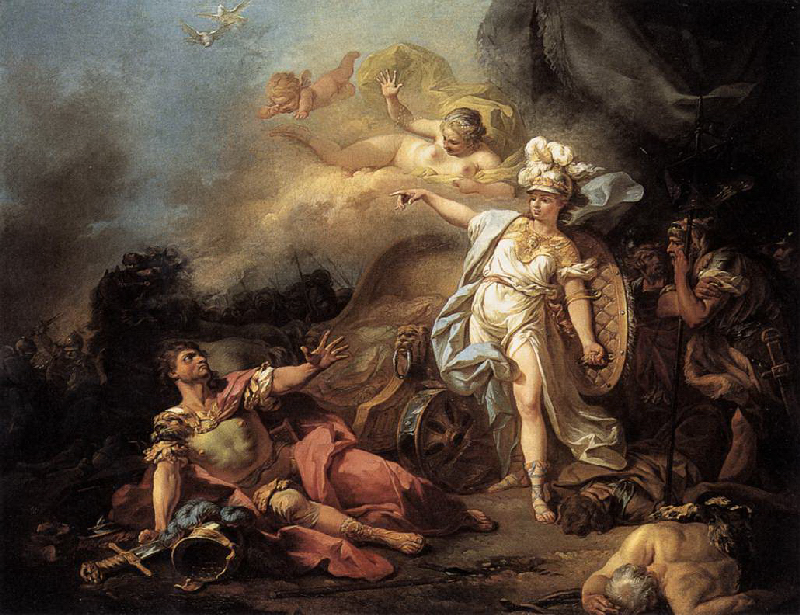
- Artist: Jacques-Louis David
- Year: 1771
- Medium: Oil on canvas
- Dimensions: 114 cm × 140 cm (45 in × 55 in)
- Location: Musée du Louvre, Paris

Minerva Fighting Mars (Combat de Mars contre Minerve) is an oil-on-canvas painting created in 1771 by the French artist Jacques-Louis David and now in the Louvre.

== History ==
David produced the painting to compete for the Prix de Rome of 1771. For the competition, he and the seven other participating artists were assigned the task of painting a new work in 10 weeks on a set subject, which that year was the Iliad. David's painting was awarded the second prize as the Prix de Rome was given to Joseph-Benoît Suvée. David believed that harsh criticism of his work by his teacher Joseph-Marie Vien had caused the prize to be awarded to an inferior painter, and became disgruntled with the academy, which he considered to be a dishonest institution. In 1774, David finally won the competition on his fourth attempt with Erasistratus Discovering the Cause of Antiochus' Disease.

== See also ==
- List of paintings by Jacques-Louis David

== Bibliography ==
- Régis Michel and Marie-Catherine Sahut, David, l'art et le politique, Paris, Gallimard, coll. « Découvertes Gallimard » (n° 46), 1988 (ISBN 2-07-053068-X)
