= Jean-Pierre Pincemin =

French painter and printmaker

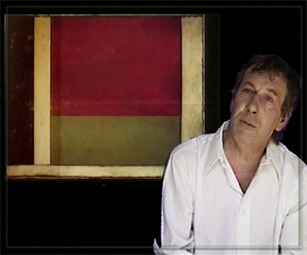
Jean-Pierre Pincemin

Jean-Pierre Pincemin (1944–2005) was a French painter and printmaker.

== Main exhibitions ==
- 2022: “Jean-Pierre Pincemin. Sculpture - Painting", Orangery of the Museums of Sens.
- 2019: Stéphane-Mallarmé Museum, Vulaines-sur-Seine.
- 2017: Univer Gallery/Colette Colla, Paris.
- 2016: Orangery of the Museums of Sens.
