= Portrait of a Young Woman in a Turban =

Painting by Jacques-Louis David

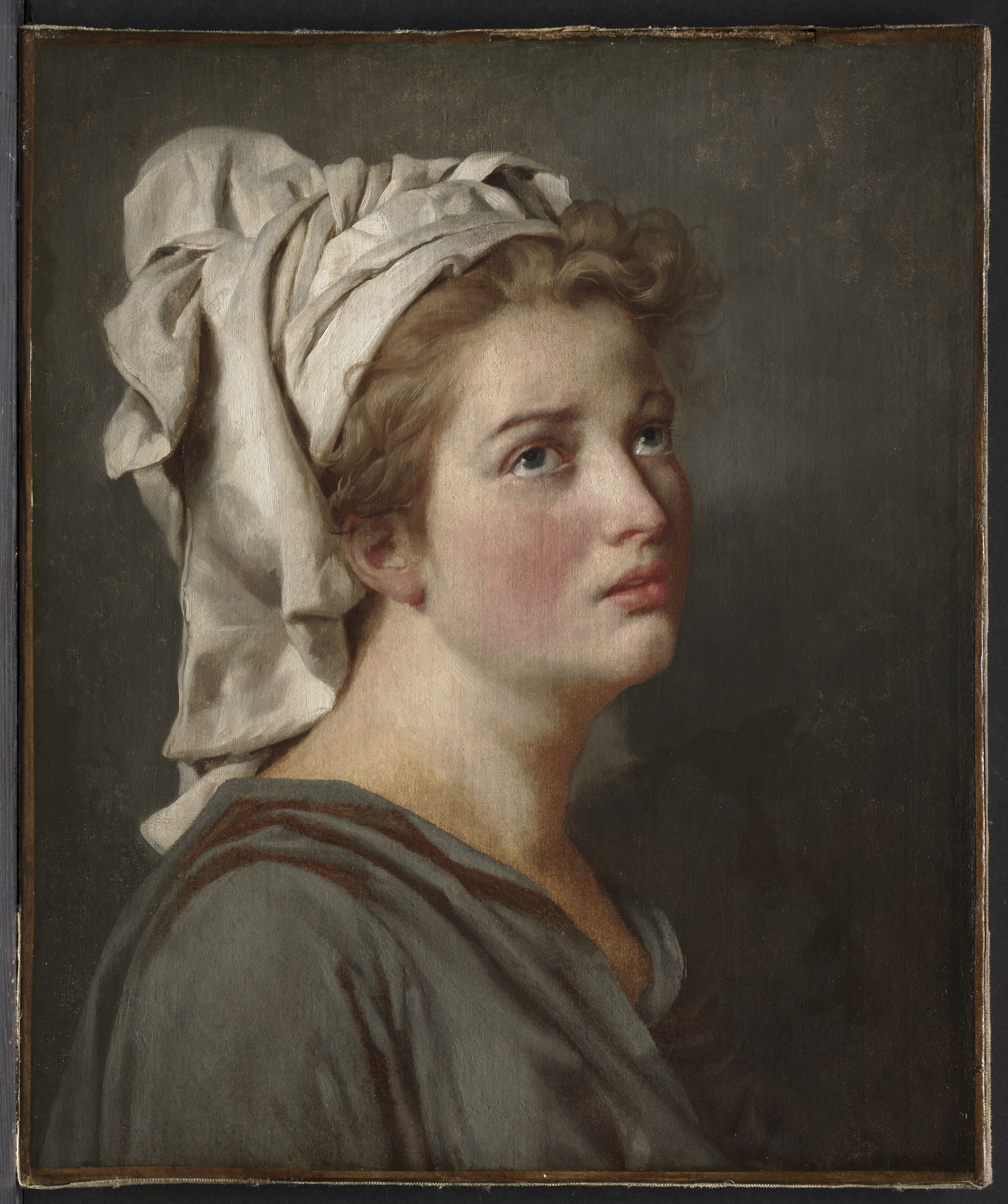
- Artist: Jacques-Louis David
- Year: 1780
- Medium: Oil on canvas
- Dimensions: 55 cm × 46 cm (22 in × 18 in)
- Location: Cleveland Museum of Art; Cleveland Ohio

Portrait of a Young Woman in a Turban is a small oil-on-canvas painting, executed around 1780 by the French Neoclassical painter Jacques-Louis David. It is a fine example of a tête d'expression study, illustrating David's mastery of emotional nuance and classical restraint.

== Description ==
The painting shows a young woman in three-quarter view, looking upward and to the side. She wears a richly folded turban, painted with delicate attention to texture and drapery. Her expression is calm yet engaging, reflecting an interior emotional quality characteristic of academic portrait studies.

== Artistic Context ==
This work served as a standard tête d'expression-an expressive head study developed at the Académie Royale de Peinture et de Sculpture beginning circa 1760. Such studies trained artists in capturing human emotion and gestures for later use in larger historical or mythological scenes.

== Provenance ==
The painting measures approximately 55.2 × 46 cm and resides in the Cleveland Museum of Art, Ohio, as part of its permanent collection.

== See also ==
- List of paintings by Jacques-Louis David
