= Portrait of Pierre Seriziat =

Painting by Jacques-Louis David

Portrait of Pierre Sériziat
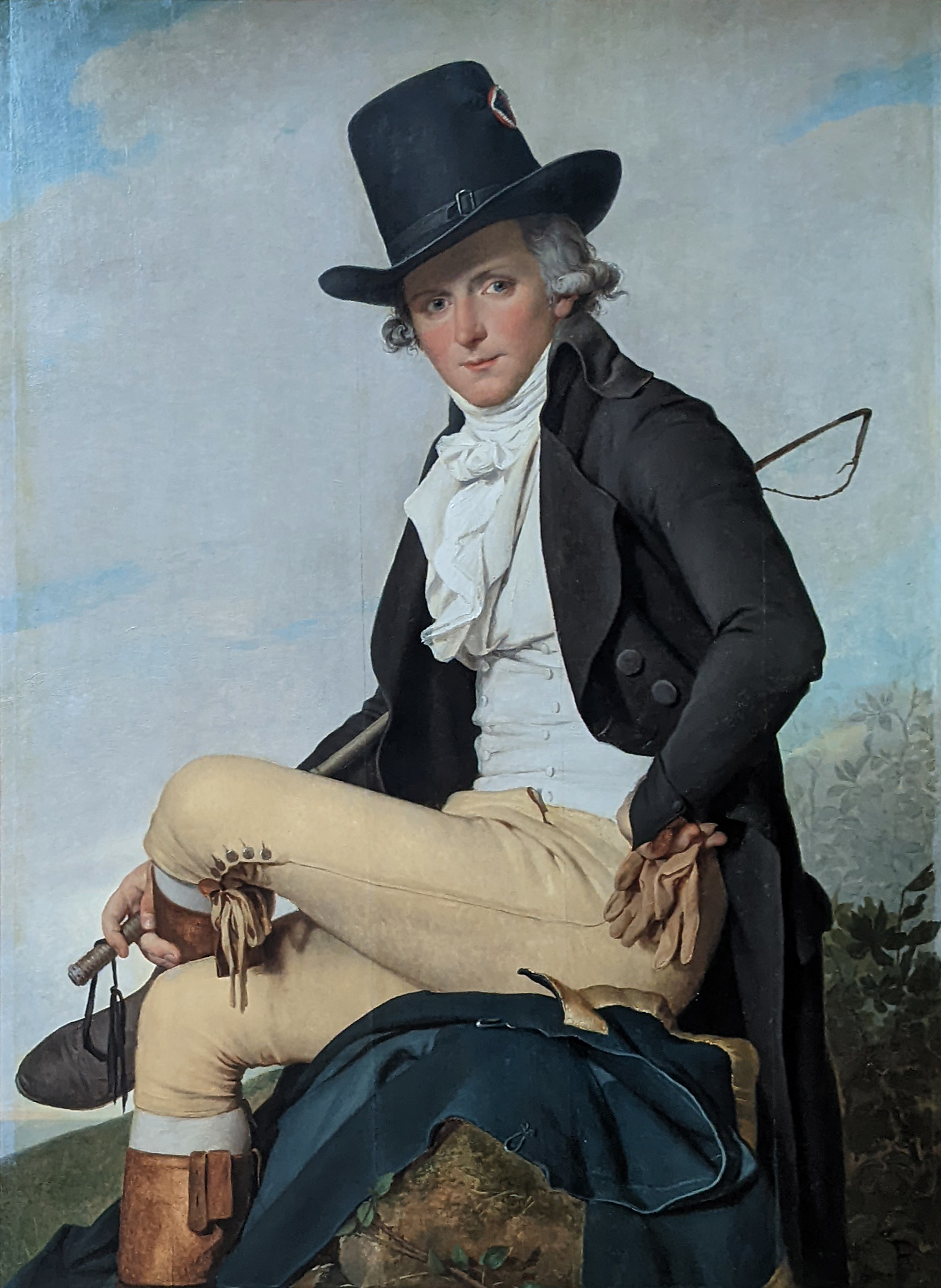
- Artist: Jacques Louis David
- Year: 1795
- Medium: Oil painting on canvas portrait
- Subject: Pierre Seriziat
- Dimensions: 96 cm × 129 cm (38 in × 51 in)
- Location: Musée du Louvre; Paris

The Portrait of Pierre Seriziat (or Sériziat) is a 1795 oil canvas portrait by French artist Jacques Louis David. The portrait shows an elegant and wealthy Frenchman, Pierre Seriziat, seated outdoors on top of a rock. The painting is one of a pair done by David for Seriziat and his wife Emilie, the sister of David's then-estranged wife Charlotte. The companion piece, Portrait of Emilie Seriziat, shows a woman in a white dress indoors, holding flowers in one hand and the hand of a child in the other. Both paintings are held in the Louvre in Paris.

== See also ==
- List of paintings by Jacques-Louis David
