= Self-Portrait (David) =

Painting by Jacques-Louis David

- Autoportrait (French)
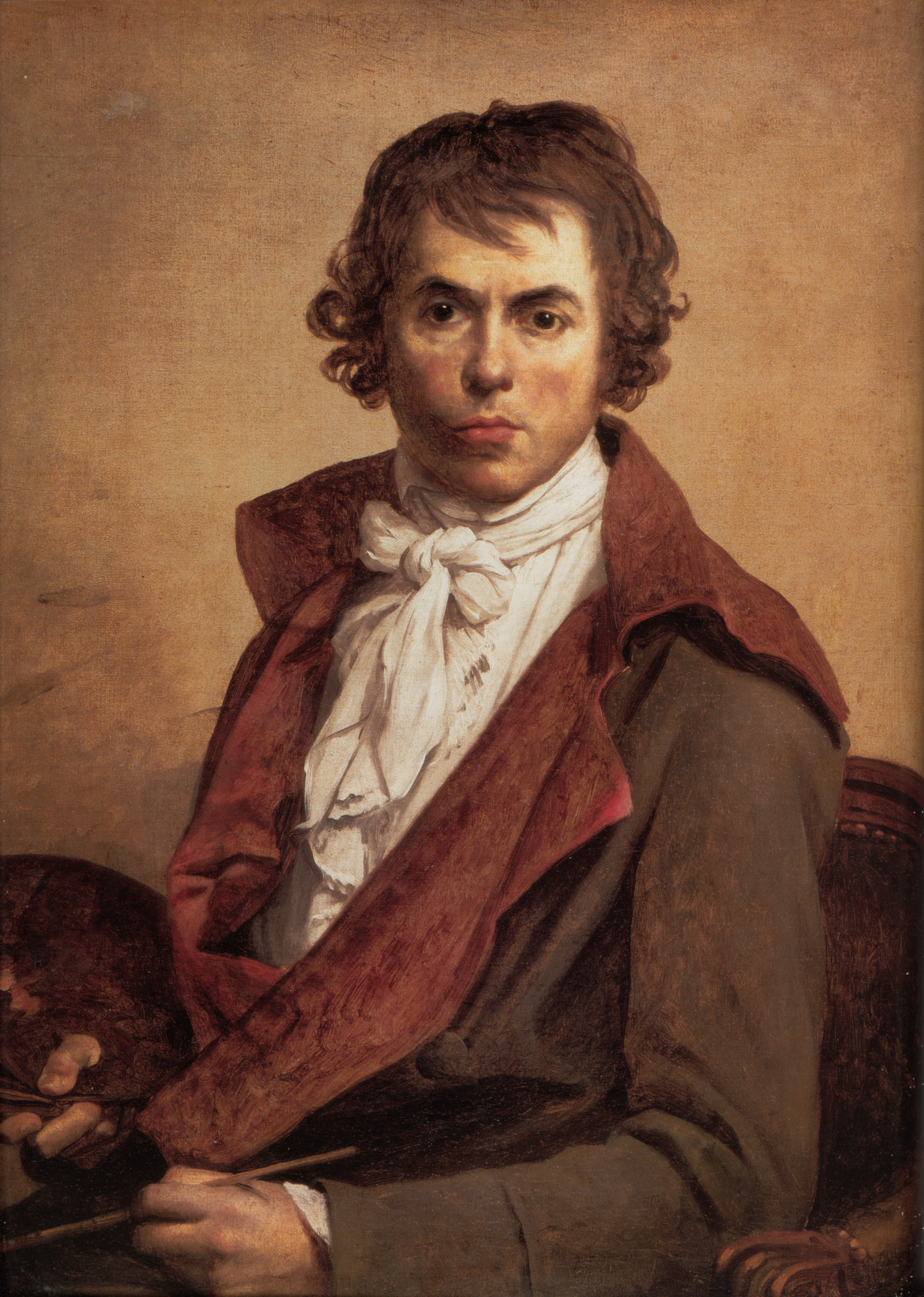
- Artist: Jacques-Louis David
- Year: 1794
- Medium: Oil on canvas
- Dimensions: 81 cm × 64 cm (32 in × 25 in)
- Location: Louvre, Paris

Self-Portrait (in French: Autoportrait) is the title of a self-portrait painted by the artist Jacques-Louis David in 1794 while in imprisonment at the Hôtel des Fermes for having supported the Robespierreans. It was his third and last self-portrait. He gave the work to his former student Jean-Baptiste Isabey. It entered the collections of the Louvre in 1852 (inv. 3705).

== Context ==
David was an active member of the Jacobins and was close friends with Maximilien Robespierre. On July 27, 1794, at the onset of the Coup of 9 Thermidor, David escaped execution due to his absence from the National Assembly. However, Robespierre and many of his followers who were present in the National Assembly were arrested and executed by guillotine the next morning. David was captured and arrested shortly after on August 2 of the same year due to his affiliation with and support for Robespierre. David was imprisoned in the Hôtel des Fermes on the same day as his arrest and on the way was accompanied by his pupil Pierre-Maximilien Delafontaine who also provided David with the mirror he used to paint his self portrait.

== Description ==
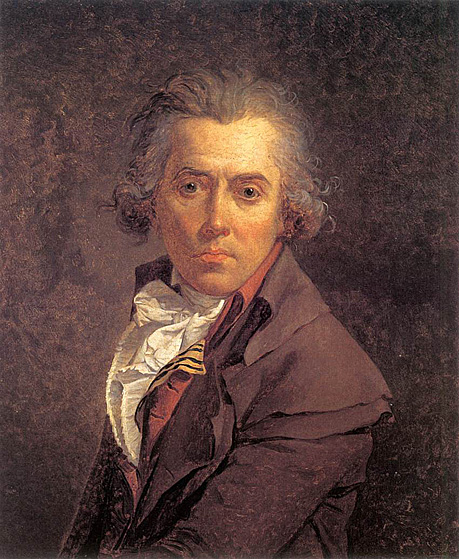
Jacques-Louis David, Self-Portrait, 1791

The painting represents the artist facing himself. He appears on a yellow-gray plain background. David is dressed in a dark overcoat with wide chestnut lapels and a white shirt, tied with a scarf of the same color–a typical approach to fashion in the 1790s. He is seated on an armchair, the back of which can be seen. The figure is illuminated from the right. David depicts himself staring directly at the viewer which is a byproduct of David using a mirror to create the portrait. The use of the mirror also affects other aspects of the painting like the positioning of the hands. David was right-handed, yet in the portrait it is his left hand which holds his brush and his right hand which holds his palette, contrary to the way right-handed artists typically present themselves. Similarly, the tumor on David's cheek, which was caused by a fencing injury, is shown to be on his right cheek in the portrait, but in reality was on his left cheek. The tumor is also partly obscured by shadow.

David represents himself as a young man, which he is no longer since he was 46 when he painted this painting. This can be seen when compared to a self portrait David painted three years earlier. In his previous self-portrait, his hair is grayer, and his eyes are more sunken, giving David a more mature appearance.

== Analysis ==
David only ever painted three self-portraits, this being his final one. He would never publicly display any of his self-portraits and ended up giving this portrait to his pupil Jean-Baptiste Isabey. These facts have led art historians to regard the creation of self-portraits by David as an exercise in self-identity and reflection. His arrest and the execution of Robespierre along with his followers marked the end of David's political career, and, due to his more active role in the previous regime, David may have felt a need to re-evaluate his own identity.

The neutral background–typical in his portraits– indicates a reluctance to portray reality, giving the impression of confinement. is In this painting, David chose to depict not only his bust, but also his hands holding a brush and palette. It is said that this may have been a strategic move by David to avoid execution by reinforcing his identity as a painter over a political activist. This theory is supported by David's decision to depict a younger version of himself with rosy cheeks, messy hair, and in a romantic style to push the idea that he is a simple, naïve painter. David's depiction of his face and expression shows that he lacks awareness, assuring the viewer that while David did take political action, he lacked foresight and goals.

His restrained appearance may have been caused by his tumor that deformed his lower left cheek, which seemingly splits his face asymmetrically in the self-portrait. The left side of his face droops down causing a furrowed brow and slight frown. It is suggested that this composition combined with the shadow covering his face implies a sense of seriousness and determination. However, the right side of his face shows a different person with a much gentler look. The art historian Douglas Cooper argued that this split represents the two sides of David, a political activist and an innocent painter.

== Postage Stamp ==
A reverse of the self-portrait was engraved on a postage stamp by René Cottet as part of the 1950 stamp series on the French Revolution of 1789; other revolutionary figures included Georges Danton, Maximilien Robespierre, André Chénier, Lazare Carnot and Lazare Hoche.

== See also ==
- Self-portraiture
- List of paintings by Jacques-Louis David
