= Portrait of comte Antoine Français de Nantes =

Painting by Jacques-Louis David

Portrait of Comte Antoine Français de Nantes
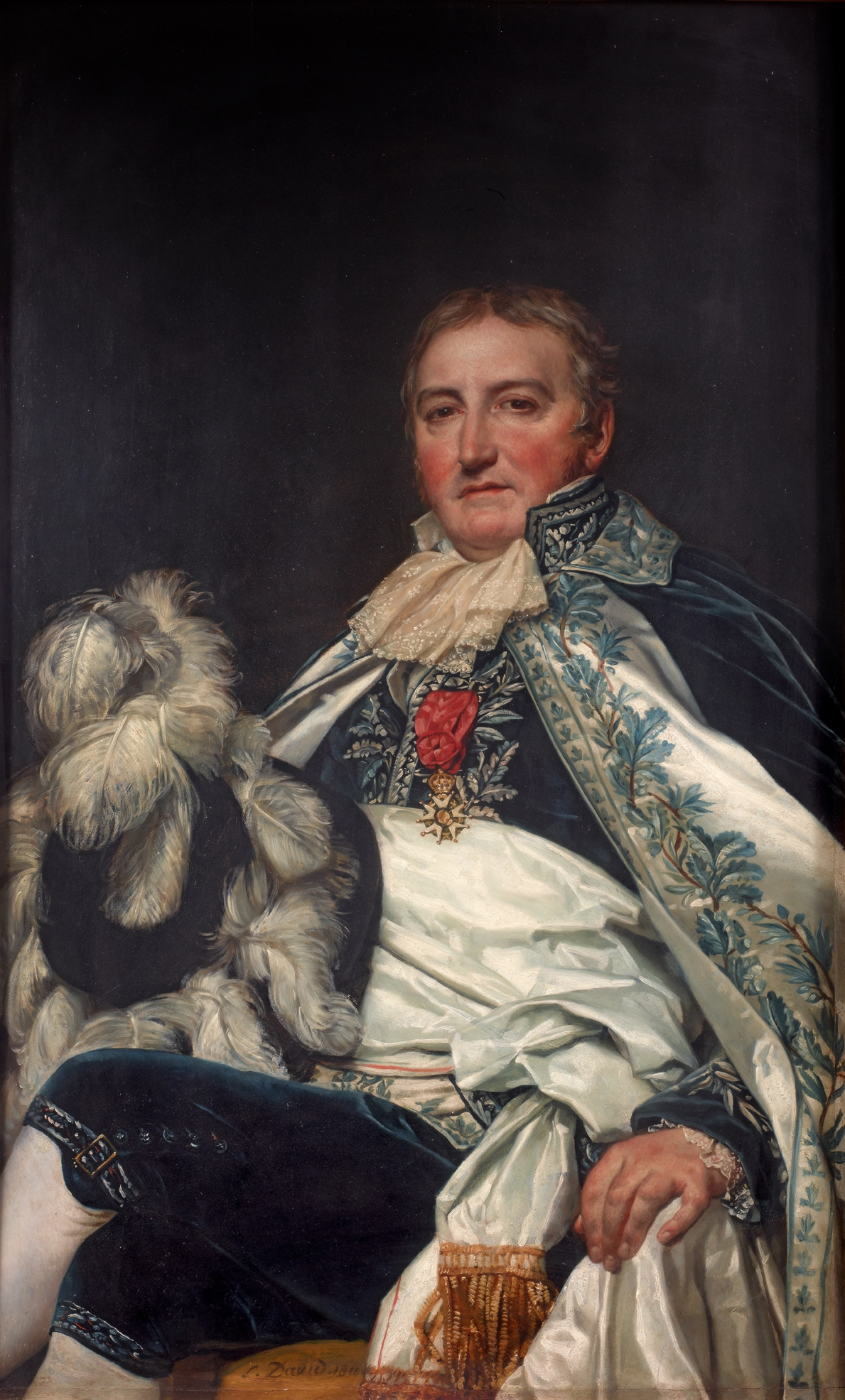
- Artist: Jacques-Louis David
- Year: 1811
- Medium: Oil on wood panel
- Dimensions: 114 cm × 75 cm (45 in × 30 in)
- Location: Musée Jacquemart-André, Paris

Portrait of comte Antoine Français de Nantes is an 1811 oil on wood panel painting by Jacques-Louis David, showing Antoine Français de Nantes, prefect, comte d'Empire and grand officier of the Légion d’honneur.

The painting portrays the count in his sumptuous robes of office, set off by the bright red ribbon of the Légion d'honneur medal, France's highest honour. The low viewpoint emphasises the subject's authority.

Commissioned by the subject himself, it remained in his family until 1889 before becoming part of the collection of Antonin Dubosc. It was then acquired in 1892 by Paul Durand-Ruel, who sold it on to Édouard André, who in turn left it in 1912 to the Institut de France with the rest of his collection. It is now exhibited at the Musée Jacquemart-André, a private museum located in the Boulevard Haussmann, Paris.

== See also ==
- List of paintings by Jacques-Louis David
