= Napoleon in Imperial Costume =

Painting by Jacques-Louis David

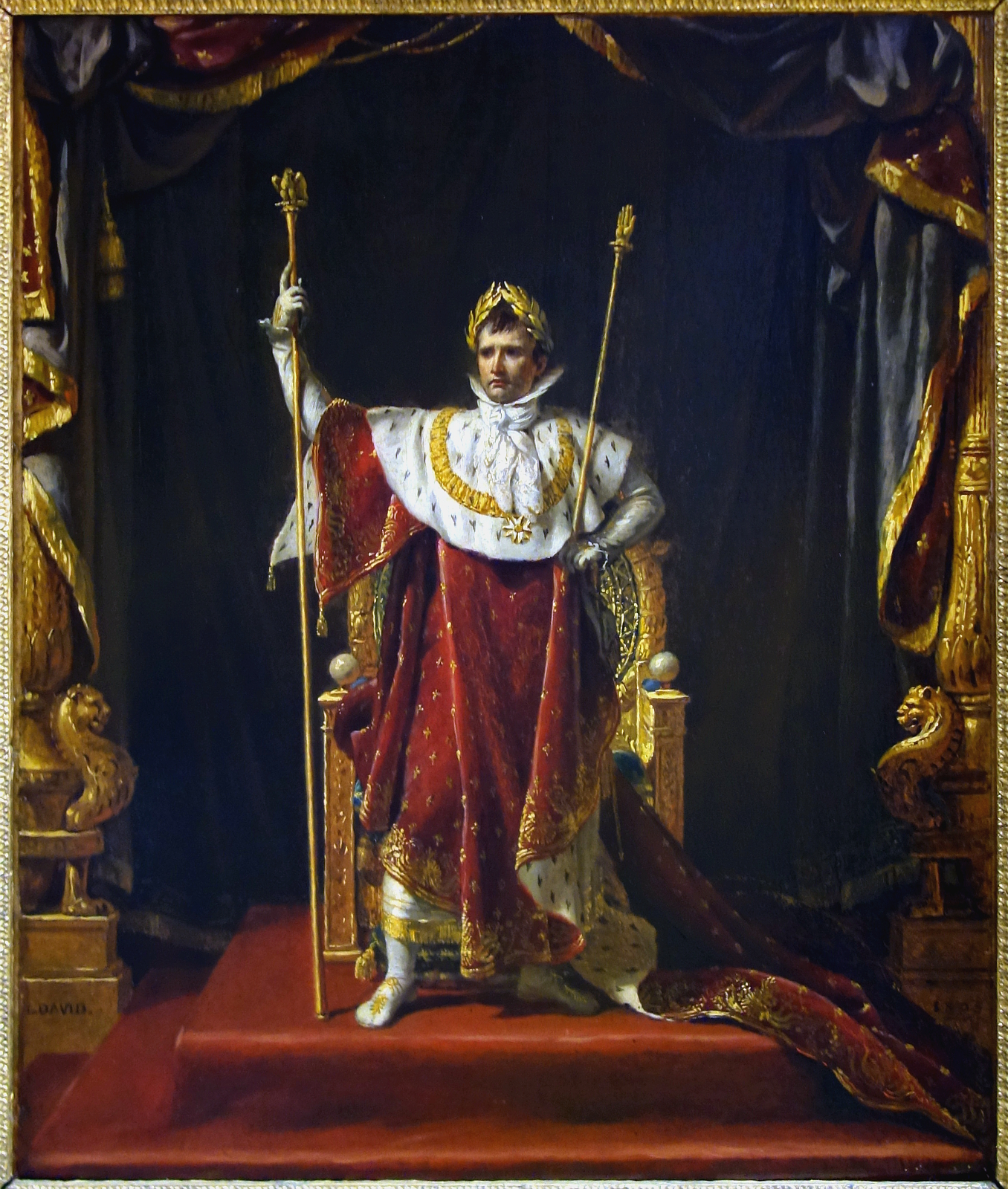
- Artist: Jacques-Louis David
- Year: 1805
- Medium: Oil on canvas
- Dimensions: 58 cm × 49 cm (23 in × 19 in)
- Location: Palais des Beaux-Arts de Lille, Lille, France

Napoleon in Imperial Costume was an 1805 portrait of Napoleon I in his coronation robes by Jacques-Louis David. Originally intended for the Tribuna in Genoa, Napoleon was unhappy with it and it was left incomplete. It is known via a small oil sketch now in the Palais des beaux-arts de Lille.

Another version of the same subject was meant for Napoleon's brother Jérôme Bonaparte, king of Westphalia. It is now lost, but known via a copy attributed to Rouget now in the Fogg Art Museum, an incomplete canvas attributed to Sebastian Weygandt in the Staatliche Kunstsammlungen in Kassel and a head study in the bibliothèque Thiers.

== See also ==
- List of paintings by Jacques-Louis David

== Bibliography ==
- Antoine Schnapper (ed.) and Arlette Sérullaz, Jacques-Louis David 1748-1825 : catalogue de l'exposition rétrospective Louvre-Versailles 1989-1990, Paris, Réunion des Musées nationaux, 1989 (ISBN 2-711-82326-1)
- Sophie Monneret, David et le néoclassicisme, Paris, Terrail, 1998 (ISBN 2879391865)
- Simon Lee, David, Paris, Phaidon, 2002 (ISBN 0714891053)
- Sylvain Laveissière (ed.), David Chanteranne, Anne Dion-Tenenbaum, Alain Pougetoux et al., Le Sacre de Napoléon peint par David, Paris, Milan, 5 Continents, 2004 (ISBN 978-8874391547)
- Philippe Bordes, David, Empire to Exile, New Haven, Yale University press, 2005 (ISBN 0-300-12346-9)
