= Lycurgus of Sparta (David) =

Painting by Jacques-Louis David

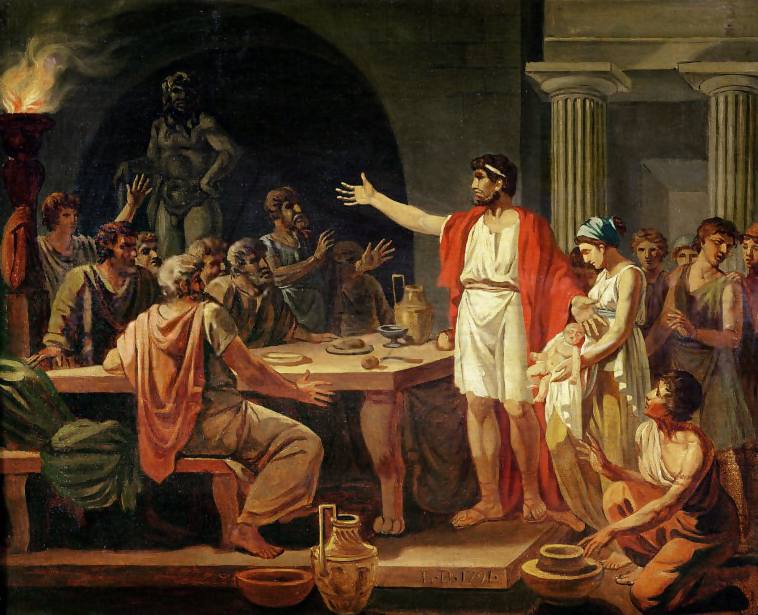
- Artist: Jacques-Louis David
- Year: 1791
- Type: oil and tempera on panel
- Location: Musée des Beaux-Arts; Blois, France

Lycurgus of Sparta is a 1791 oil painting attributed to the French painter Jacques-Louis David which is in the collection of the Musée des Beaux-Arts, Blois, France.

The David painting is likely based on the account of Plutarch. In this version of the myth, Lycurgus, quasi-legendary lawgiver of the state of Sparta, was the younger son of a king of Sparta who became king himself when his elder brother died shortly after their father. His brother's wife was pregnant at the time and Lycurgus dutifully handed over the kingship to the child when it was born. Plutarch says that Spartan custom demanded that all new-born babies be vetted by a council of elders at a Lesche, who ordered that any with disabilities were to be taken to die in the open on a mountainside at Apothetae (this is contradicted by archeological evidence and some other classical sources).

One interpretation of David's picture is that Lycurgus was standing in for his brother in showing the new-born baby and future king to the council for their approval. Alternatively he is merely organising the screening process for a number of new-born babies.

== See also ==
- List of paintings by Jacques-Louis David
- Wikisource:Plutarch's Lives (Clough)/Life of Lycurgus (not historically accurate)
