= The Funeral of Patroclus =

Painting by Jacques-Louis David

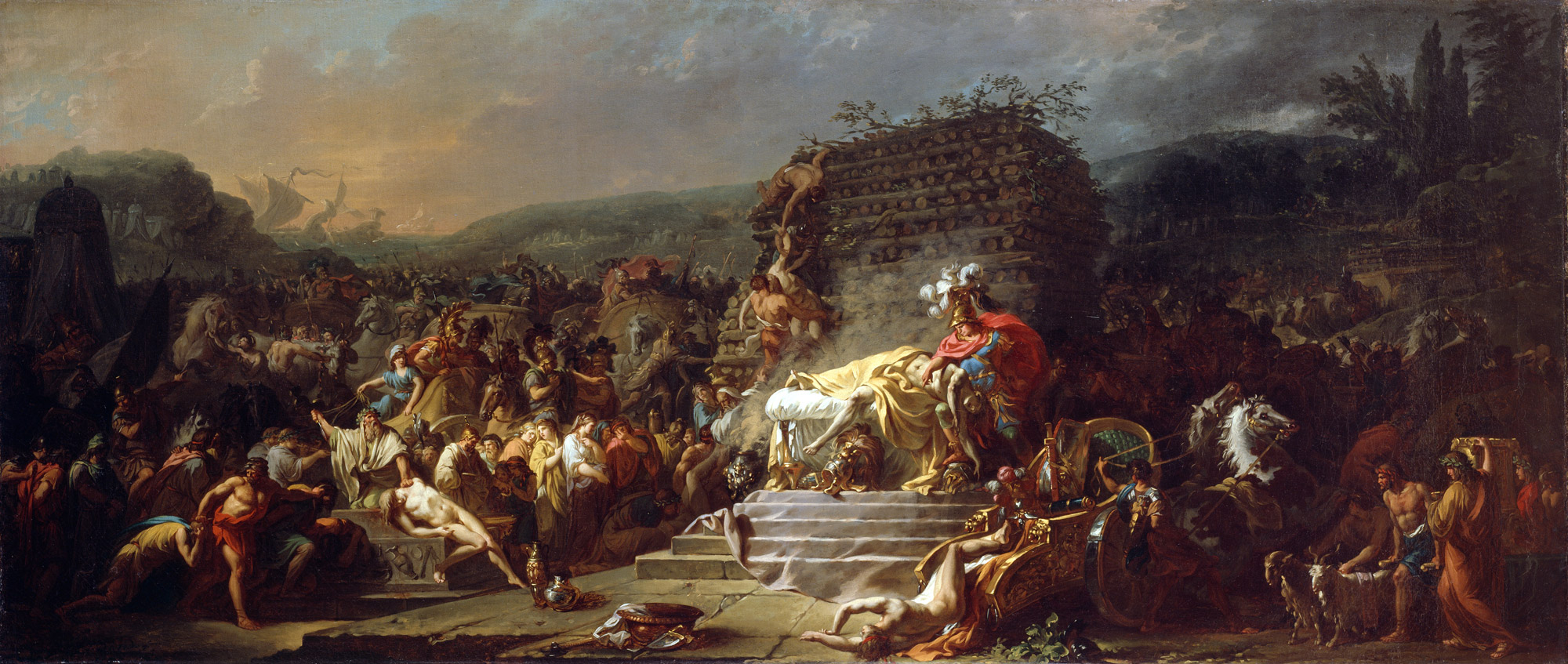
- Artist: Jacques-Louis David
- Year: 1778
- Medium: Oil on canvas
- Dimensions: 94 cm × 218 cm (37 in × 86 in)
- Location: National Gallery of Ireland, Dublin

The Funeral of Patroclus is a 1778 oil-on-canvas painting by the French artist Jacques-Louis David. It shows the funeral of Patroclus during Trojan War, with his body and Achilles at the foot of the pyre and Hector resting on his chariot on the right. It was first exhibited at the Palazzo Mancini in Rome in September 1778, where it was a critical success. It was then lost until 1972, when it was acquired by the National Gallery of Ireland, its present home. The painting was purchased in 1973 by the Shaw Fund.

== See also ==
- List of paintings by Jacques-Louis David

== Bibliography ==
- Régis Michel et Marie-Catherine Sahut, David, l'art et le politique, Paris, Gallimard, coll. « Découvertes Gallimard » (n° 46), 1988 (ISBN 2-07-053068-X), p.s 12, 21, 23
