= Portrait of Jacques-François Desmaisons =

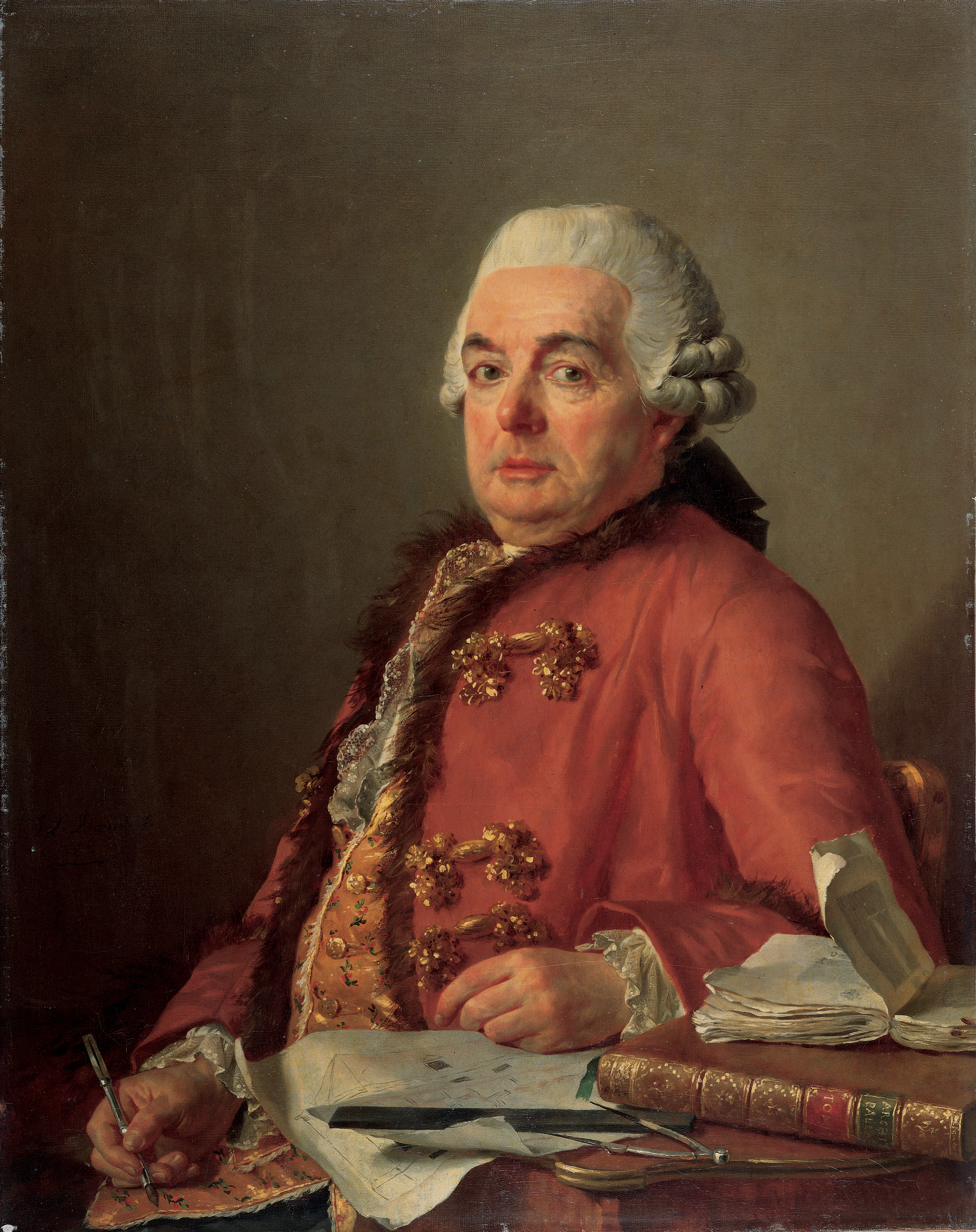
- Artist: Jacques-Louis David
- Year: 1782
- Medium: Oil on canvas
- Dimensions: 91.44 cm × 72.39 cm (36.00 in × 28.50 in)
- Location: Buffalo AKG Art Museum; Buffalo, NY

Portrait of Jacques-François Desmaisons is an oil painting created in 1782 by the French Neoclassical artist Jacques-Louis David. The work is noted for its intellectual tone and compositional clarity, and it offers a vivid portrayal of Desmaisons as a professional and Enlightenment-era figure.

== Description ==
The painting features Jacques-François Desmaisons, a French architect and academic affiliated with the Royal Academy of Architecture. He is depicted seated at a desk, surrounded by architectural tools such as a compass, ruler, and blueprints. Books are also present on the table, including a clearly labeled volume of Palladio, referencing Andrea Palladio, the influential Renaissance architect.

== Provenance ==
The portrait was completed in 1782 and is currently housed in the Buffalo AKG Art Museum (formerly known as the Albright-Knox Art Gallery) in Buffalo, New York. It entered the museum's permanent collection in the 20th century.

== Significance ==
The painting is notable as one of the few early portraits by David portraying a member of the professional bourgeoisie rather than the aristocracy. It reflects a shift in artistic and societal values on the eve of the French Revolution, where intellect and civic responsibility began to take precedence over noble birth.

== See also ==
- List of paintings by Jacques-Louis David
