= Portrait of the Marquise d'Orvilliers =

Painting by Jacques-Louis David

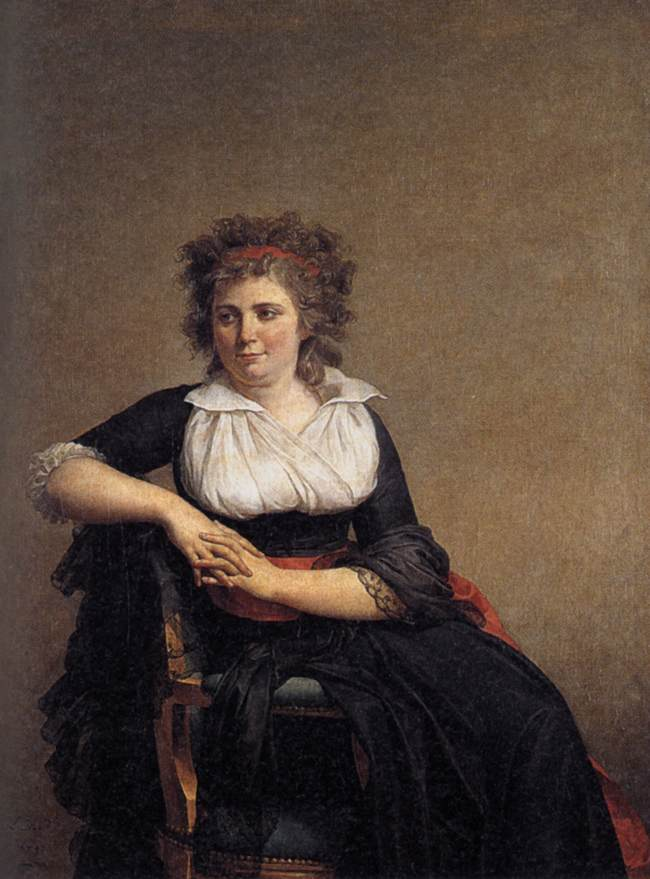
- Artist: Jacques-Louis David
- Year: 1790
- Medium: Oil on canvas
- Dimensions: 131 cm × 98 cm (52 in × 39 in)
- Location: Louvre Museum, Paris

Portrait of the Marquise d'Orvilliers (French: Portrait de la Marquise d'Orvilliers) is an oil-on-canvas portrait painted in 1790 by Jacques-Louis David. The subject is Jeanne Robertine Tourteau d'Orvilliers (née Rilliet, 1772-1862), who married Jean Louis Tourteau d'Orvilliers in 1789.

== Provenance ==
The work was likely commissioned around the time of Jeanne's marriage in 1789. It remained within the family until 1923 when it was bequeathed to the French state. The painting is now in the collection of the Musée du Louvre, Paris (inventory number RF 2418).

== See also ==
- List of paintings by Jacques-Louis David
