= Portrait of Alphonse Leroy =

Painting by Jacques-Louis David

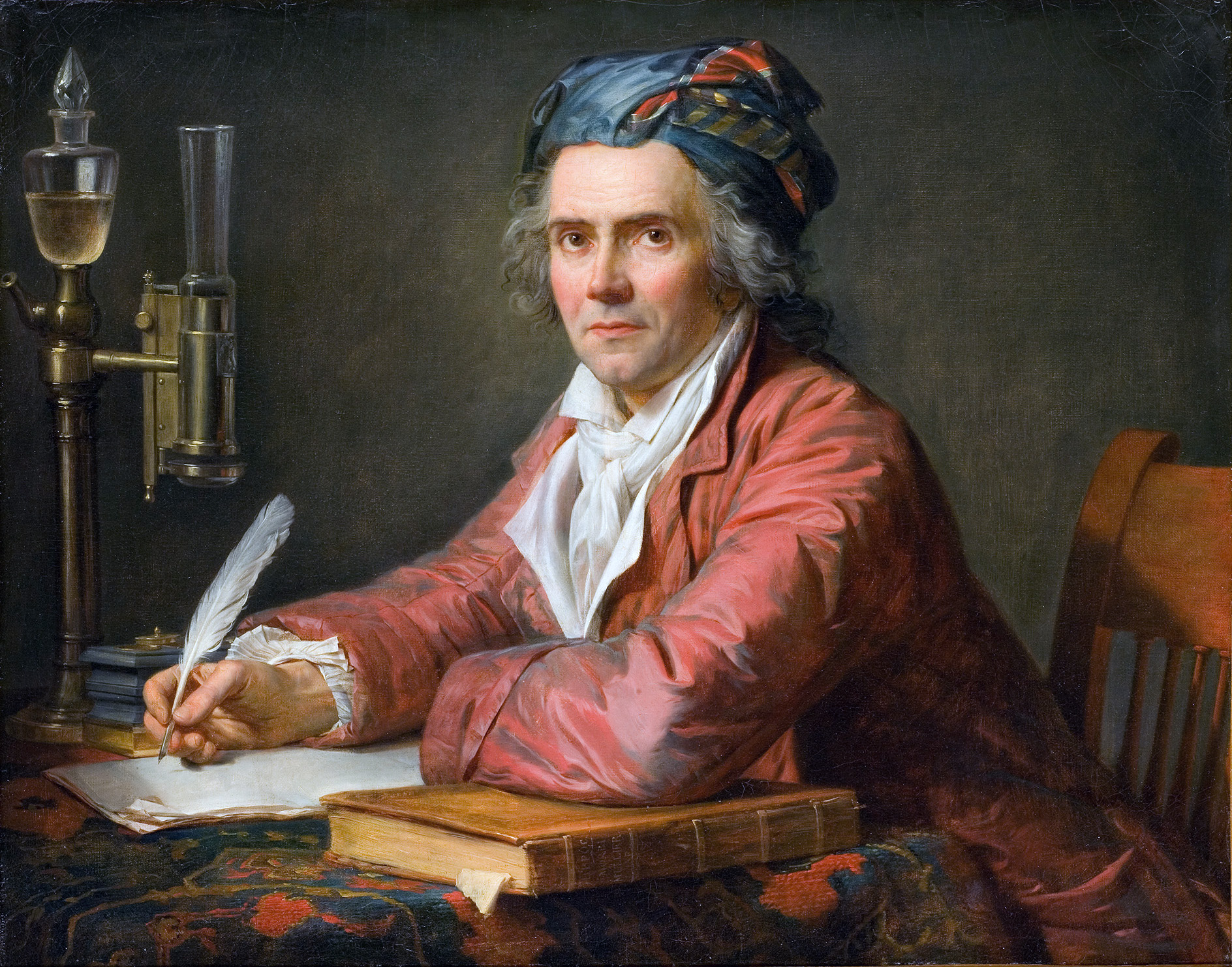
- Artist: Jacques-Louis David
- Year: 1783
- Medium: Oil on canvas
- Dimensions: 72 cm × 91 cm (28 in × 36 in)
- Location: Musée Fabre, Montpellier

Portrait of Alphonse Leroy is a 1783 oil-on-canvas portrait of doctor and man-midwife Alphonse Leroy by the French Neoclassical artist Jacques-Louis David. It is now in the Musée Fabre in Montpellier, which bought it in 1829.

The painting shows its subject looking towards the spectator and leaning on a closed copy of Hippocrates' Morbi mulierum, a work on women's illnesses. On the desk is a 'lampe à quinquet', invented by Leroy himself. Together the lamp and book make reference to Cesare Ripa's Iconologia, which states these are the attributes of a study.

The naturalistic attention to detail and its bright tonality show how David was influenced by Flemish painters during his 1781 stay in Flanders. One of his pupils, Jean-François Garneray, assisted in painting the hands and fabrics. The painting was first exhibited at the Paris Salon of 1783.

== See also ==
- List of paintings by Jacques-Louis David

== Bibliography (in French) ==
- Antoine Schnapper, David : Témoin de son temps, Fribourg, Office du Livre, 1980 [détail des éditions] (ISBN 2850470007)
- Antoine Schnapper (ed.) and Arlette Sérullaz, Jacques-Louis David 1748-1825 : catalogue de l'exposition rétrospective Louvre-Versailles 1989-1990, Paris, Réunion des musées nationaux, 1989 (ISBN 2711823261)
- Luc de Nanteuil, David, Paris, Cercle d'Art, coll. « les grands peintres », 1987 (ISBN 2-7022-0203-9)
- Régis Michel and Marie-Catherine Sahut, David : L'art et le politique, Paris, Gallimard, coll. « Découvertes Gallimard / Arts » (nº 46), 1988 (ISBN 2-07-053068-X)
- Sophie Monneret, David et le néoclassicisme, Paris, Terrail, 1998 (ISBN 2879391865)
- Simon Lee, David, Paris, Phaidon, 2002 (ISBN 0714891053)
