= Diana and Apollo Killing Niobe's Children =

Painting by Jacques-Louis David

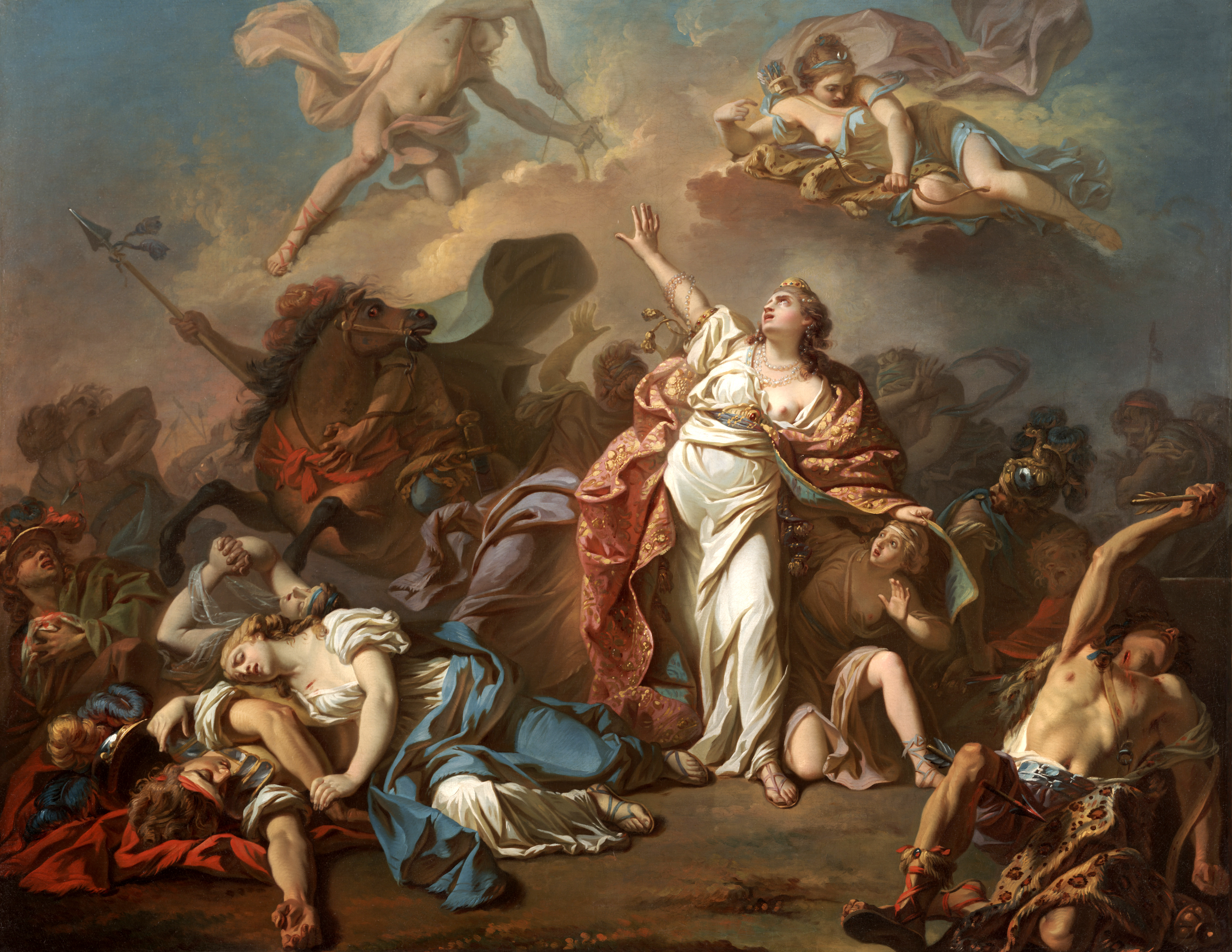
- Artist: Jacques-Louis David
- Year: 1772
- Medium: Oil on canvas
- Dimensions: 120.65 cm × 153.67 cm (47.50 in × 60.50 in)
- Location: Dallas Museum of Art, Texas

Diana and Apollo Killing Niobe's Children is a 1772 oil-on-canvas painting by the French artist Jacques-Louis David, now in the Dallas Museum of Art. He produced it to compete for the Prix de Rome. In the Rococo style which marked his early period, it was emblematic of the conflict between David and the Académie royale de peinture et de sculpture jury, which refused him the prize following a pre-arranged vote.

== See also ==
- List of paintings by Jacques-Louis David

== Bibliography ==
- Marie-Catherine Sahut et Michel, David : l'art et le politique, coll. Découvertes Gallimard, vol. 46, Paris, Gallimard, 1988 (ISBN 2-07-053068-X)
- Sophie Monneret, David et le néoclassicisme, Paris, Terrail, 1998 (ISBN 2879391865)
