= Christ on the Cross (David) =

Painting by Jacques-Louis David

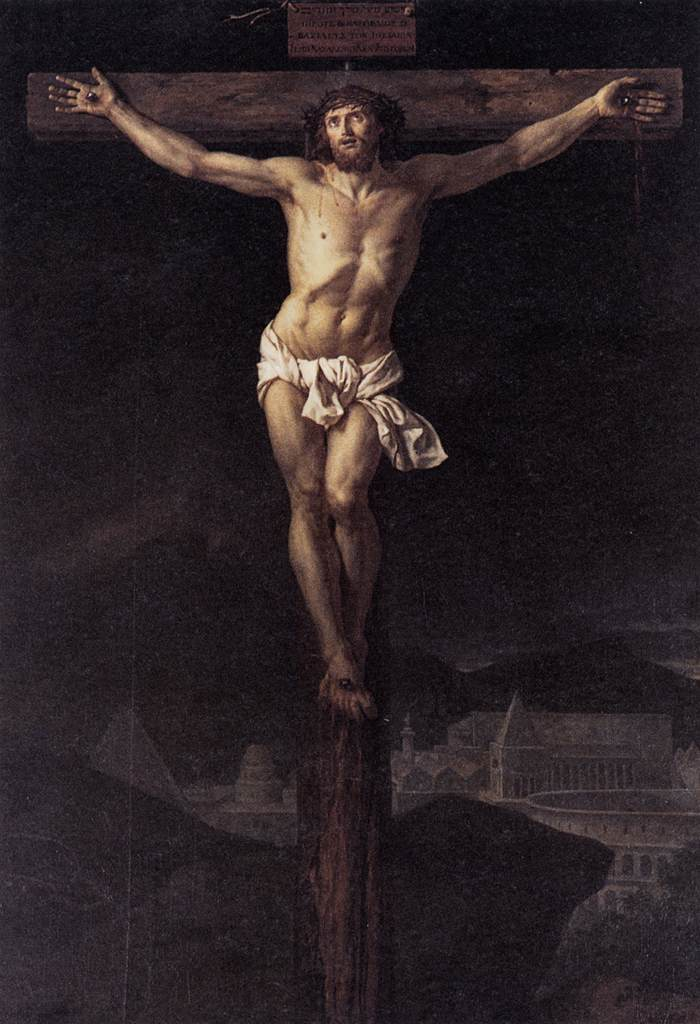
- Artist: Jacques-Louis David
- Year: 1782
- Medium: Oil on canvas
- Dimensions: 276 cm × 188 cm (109 in × 74 in)
- Location: Church of St Vincent, Mâcon

Christ on the Cross is a 1782 oil-on-canvas painting by the French Neoclassical artist Jacques-Louis David. It was commissioned by marshal Louis de Noailles and his wife Catherine de Cossé-Brissac for their family chapel in the église des Capucins in Paris. One of David's few religious works, it is now in the église Saint-Vincent in Mâcon.

== See also ==
- List of paintings by Jacques-Louis David

== Bibliography ==
- Antoine Schnapper (ed.) and Arlette Sérullaz, Jacques-Louis David 1748–1825: catalogue de l'exposition rétrospective Louvre-Versailles 1989-1990, Paris, Réunion des Musées nationaux, 1989 (ISBN 2711823261)
- Sophie Monneret, David et le néoclassicisme, Paris, Terrail, 1998 (ISBN 2879391865)
- Simon Lee, David, Paris, Phaidon, 2002 (ISBN 0714891053)
