= Portrait of Cooper Penrose =

Painting by Jacques-Louis David

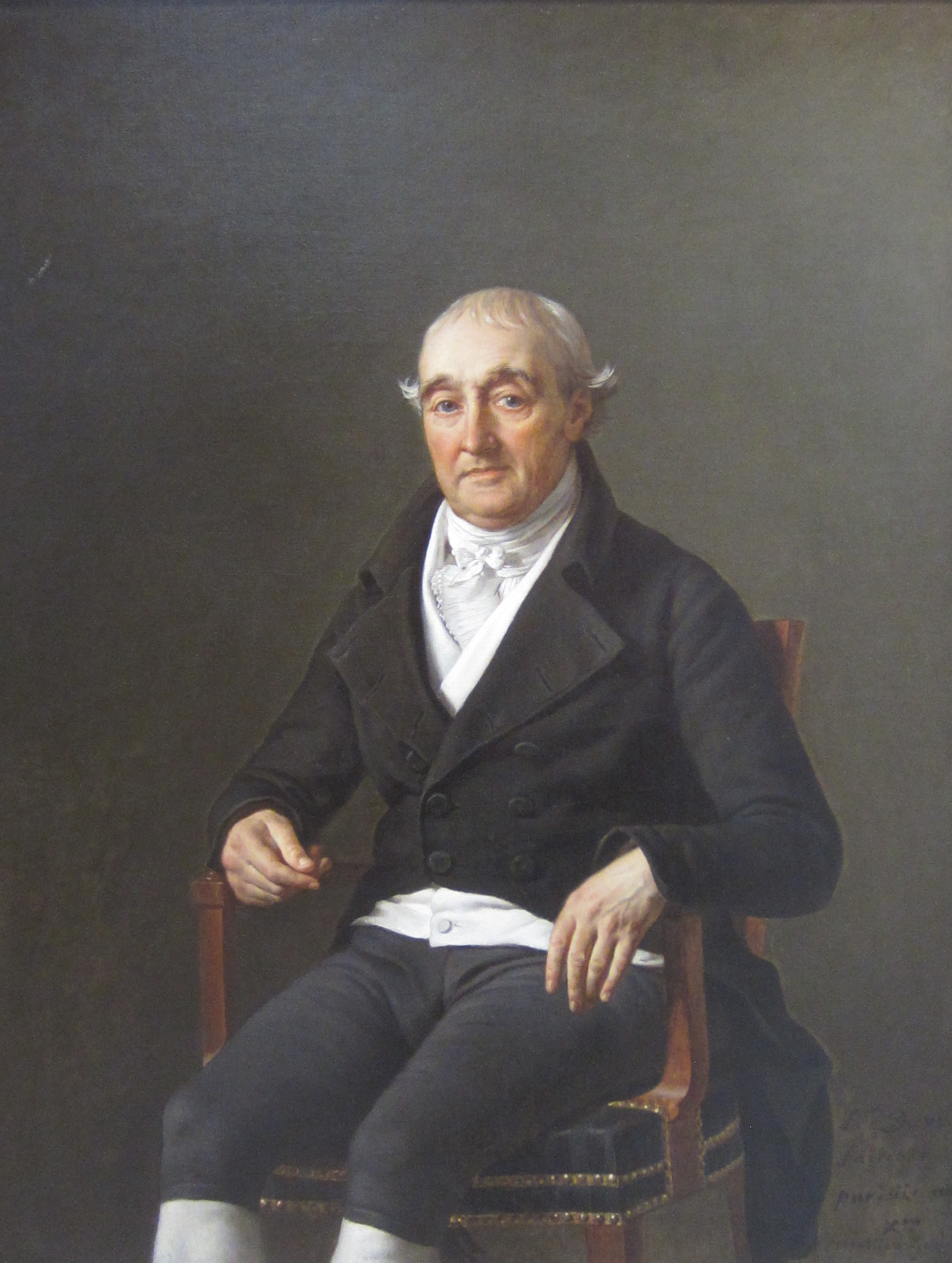
- Artist: Jacques-Louis David
- Year: 1802
- Medium: oil on canvas
- Dimensions: 130.5 cm × 97.5 cm (51.4 in × 38.4 in)
- Location: Timken Museum of Art, San Diego

Portrait of Cooper Penrose is an 1802 oil painting on canvas by Jacques-Louis David. It depicts the Irish Quaker Cooper Penrose.

== See also ==
- List of paintings by Jacques-Louis David
