= Portrait of Jacobus Blauw =

Painting by Jacques-Louis David

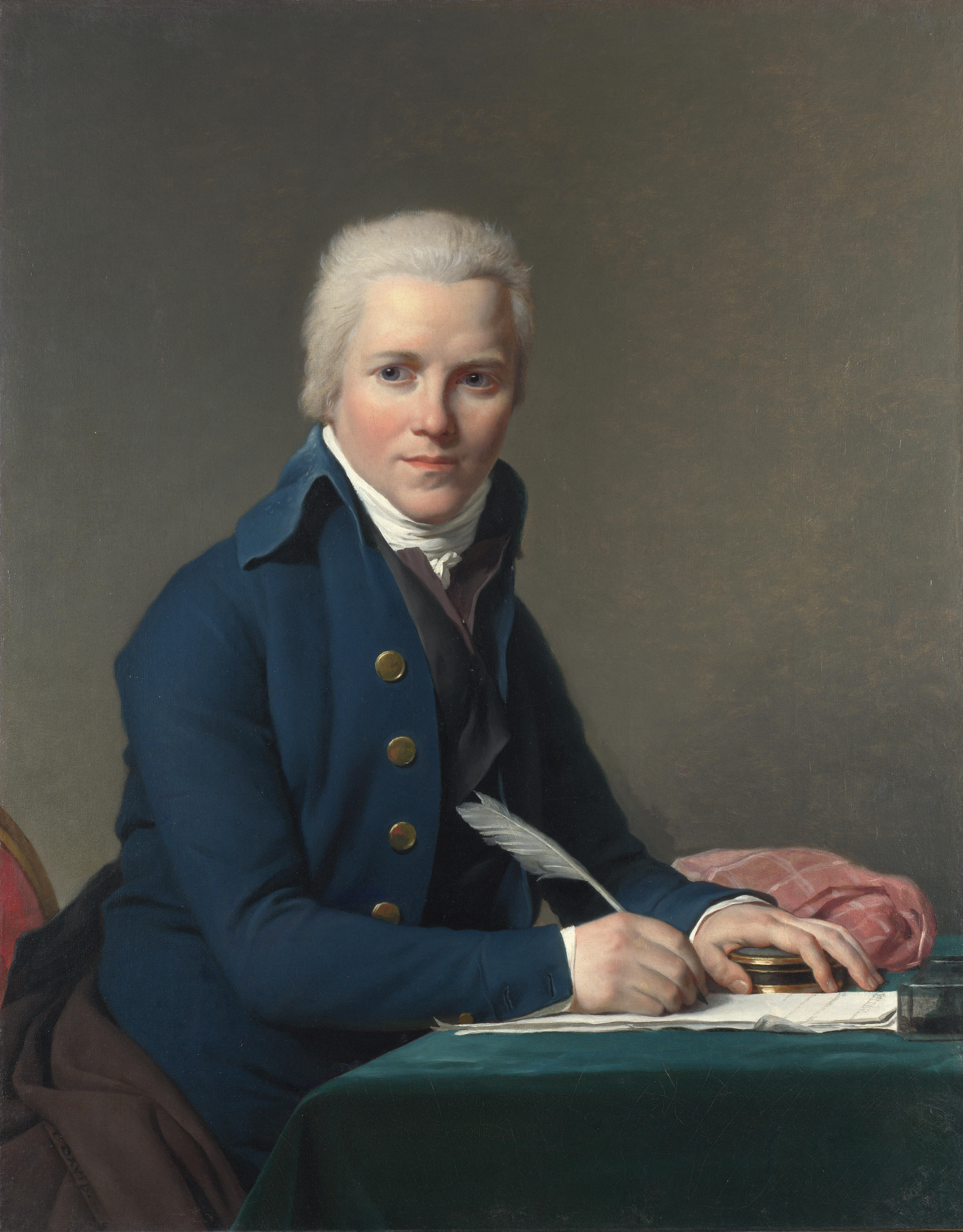
- Artist: Jacques-Louis David
- Year: 1795
- Type: Oil on canvas, portrait painting
- Dimensions: 92 cm × 73 cm (36 in × 29 in)
- Location: National Gallery; London

Portrait of Jacobus Blauw is a 1795 portrait painting by the French artist Jacques-Louis David depicting the Dutch politician and diplomat Jacobus Blauw. Blauw was the representative of the revolutionary Batavian Republic in Paris.

Today the painting is in the collection of the National Gallery in London.

== See also ==
- List of paintings by Jacques-Louis David

== Bibliography ==
- De Nanteuil, Luc. Jacques-Louis David. Abrams, 1985.
- Freund, Amy. Portraiture and Politics in Revolutionary France. Penn State University Press, 2015.
- Monneret, Sophie. David and Neo-classicism. Terrail, 1999.
