= Michel Ghislain Stapleaux =

Belgian painter (1799–1881)

Michel Ghislain Stapleaux (26 June 1799 in Brussels – 1881 in Gien) was a Belgian portraitist and history painter. He was the husband of the flower painter Louise Schavije and won two gold medals for history painting, in the competitions at Brussels in 1822 and Antwerp in 1823.

== Life ==
He studied under the French painter Jacques-Louis David and was his last assistant during his years of exile in Brussels. His main collaboration with his master was Mars Disarmed by Venus and the Graces - he organised its exhibition in Paris in 1824. He also completed David's The Anger of Achilles and was put in charge of supervising the engravings after Speech in the tennis court, The Coronation of Napoleon and Leonidas at Thermopylae. He was present at David's death, took part in his funeral in January 1826 with Joseph Paelinck and François-Joseph Navez and placed David's palette and paintbrushes on his tomb.

In 1834 he was commissioned to paint the portraits of Jérôme Bonaparte's family in Stuttgart as official painter to the king of Wurtemberg - he received the grand medal of merit of Wurtemberg in 1839.

== Sources ==
- Johannes Immerzeel2 & C. H. Immerzeel, De levens en werken der Hollandsche en Vlaamsche kunstschilders, 1842, p. 108
