= Ancient Philosopher (David) =

1779 painting by Jacques-Louis David

- Le Philosophe (French)
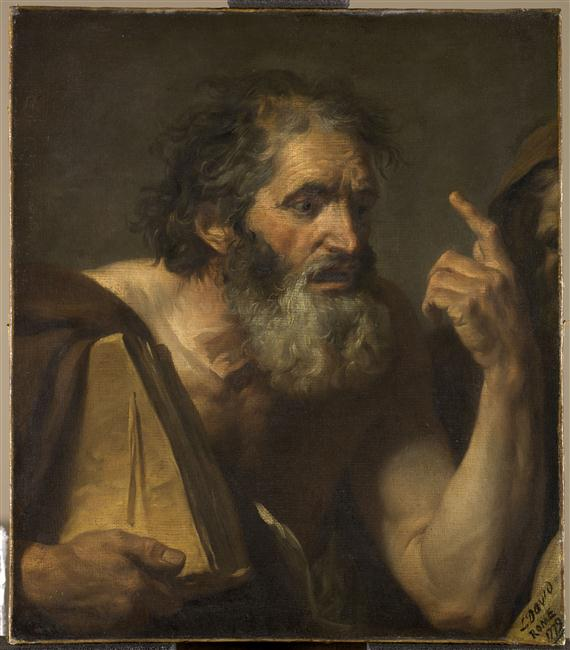
- Artist: Jacques-Louis David
- Year: 1779
- Medium: Oil on canvas
- Dimensions: 74 cm × 64 cm (29 in × 25 in)
- Location: Museum of Baron Gerard, Bayeux, France

Ancient Philosopher (French: Le Philosophe) is an oil-on-canvas painting created around 1779 by French Neoclassical artist Jacques-Louis David. The work portrays an elderly bearded man, imagined as a classical sage, in a meditative and introspective pose. It is considered one of David's early explorations of philosophical and psychological themes in portraiture.

== See also ==
- List of paintings by Jacques-Louis David
