= Portrait of François Buron =

Painting by Jacques-Louis David

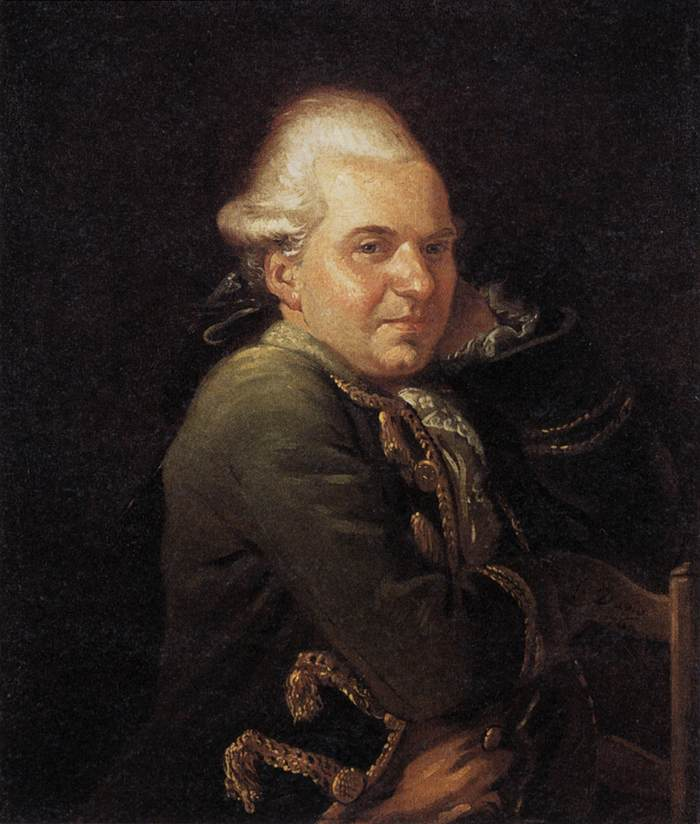
- Artist: Jacques-Louis David
- Year: 1769
- Medium: Oil on canvas
- Dimensions: 65 cm × 54 cm (26 in × 21 in)

The Portrait of François Buron is an oil-on-canvas painting executed in 1769 by the French artist Jacques-Louis David.

It dates from his period of training and is one of his earliest known works. It shows his uncle, François Buron, who encouraged David to become an architect and whose wife, Marie-Josèphe Fromont, was supportive of David’s desire to become a painter.

The portrait remained with his descendants until the death of his final descendant, A Baudry, in 1903. It was sold at the Regnault sale on 22 June 1905 for exactly 6,000 francs. It then passed to Drouot at the Victor Gay sale on 23 April 1909 for 1,500 francs. It was sold anonymously on 15 December 1937 and later formed part of the collections of Robert Lebel and Madame Gas. It was sold to the Wildenstein galerie and then to its present private owner in New York in 1985.

== See also ==
- List of paintings by Jacques-Louis David
