= Hector (Jacques-Louis David) =

1778 oil-on-canvas painting

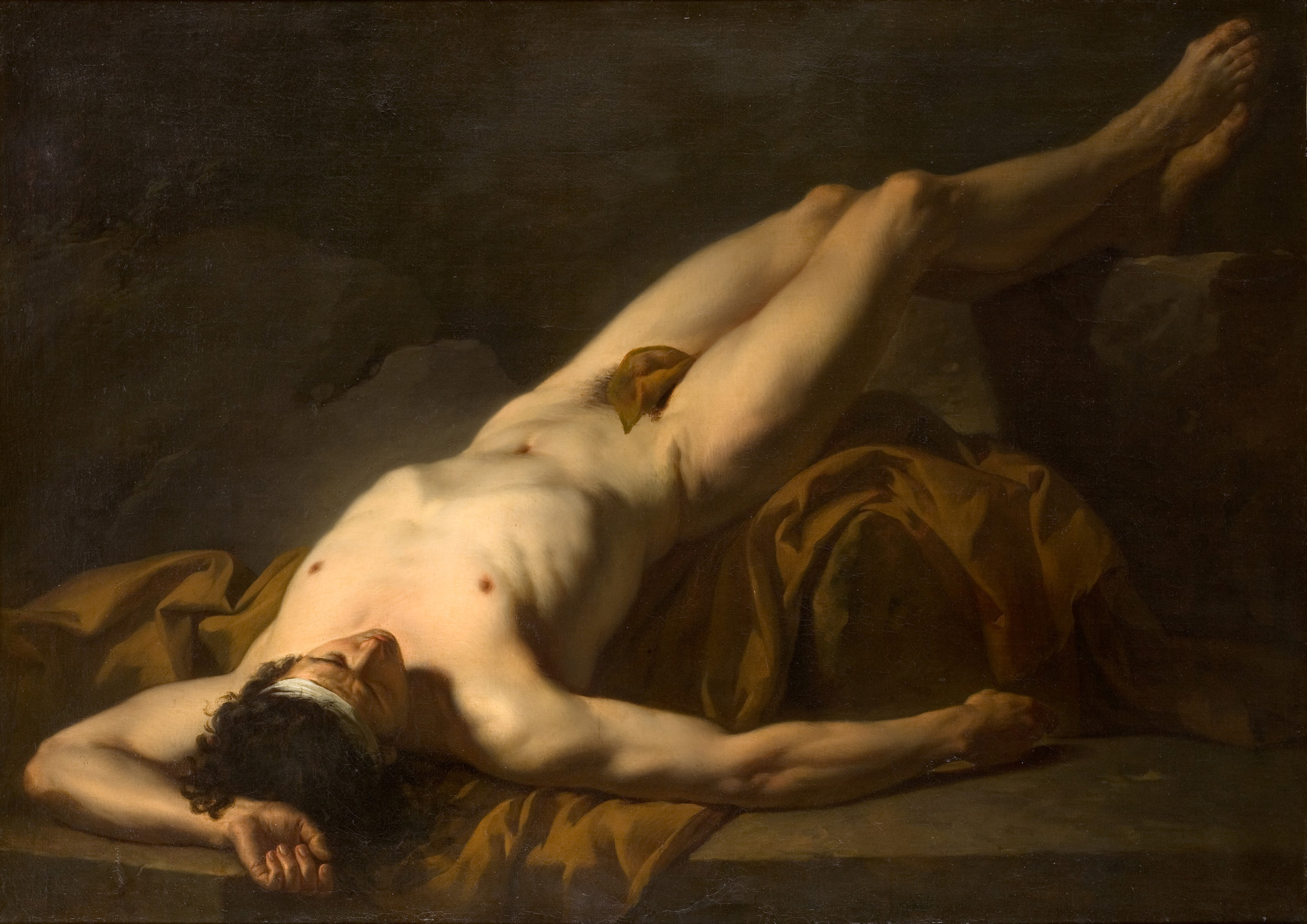
- Artist: Jacques-Louis David
- Year: 1778
- Medium: Oil on canvas
- Dimensions: 123 cm × 172 cm (48 in × 68 in)
- Location: Musée Fabre, Montpellier

Hector is an oil painting on canvas of 1778 by the French Neoclassical painter Jacques-Louis David. It depicts the legendary Trojan hero Hector in a solemn, lifeless state, combining dramatic naturalism with early indications of David's later classical restraint.

== Significance ==
While lesser-known compared to David's grand historical canvases, Hector offers insight into his formative artistic phase. It blends classical subject matter with raw emotional force, marking a transitional point between his academic training and the fully realized Neoclassical style that would define his later works.

== Provenance ==
The painting is held in the Musée Fabre in Montpellier, France, as part of its collection of 18th-century French art.

== See also ==
- List of paintings by Jacques-Louis David
