= Portrait of Flutist François Devienne =

Portrait of flautist François Devienne
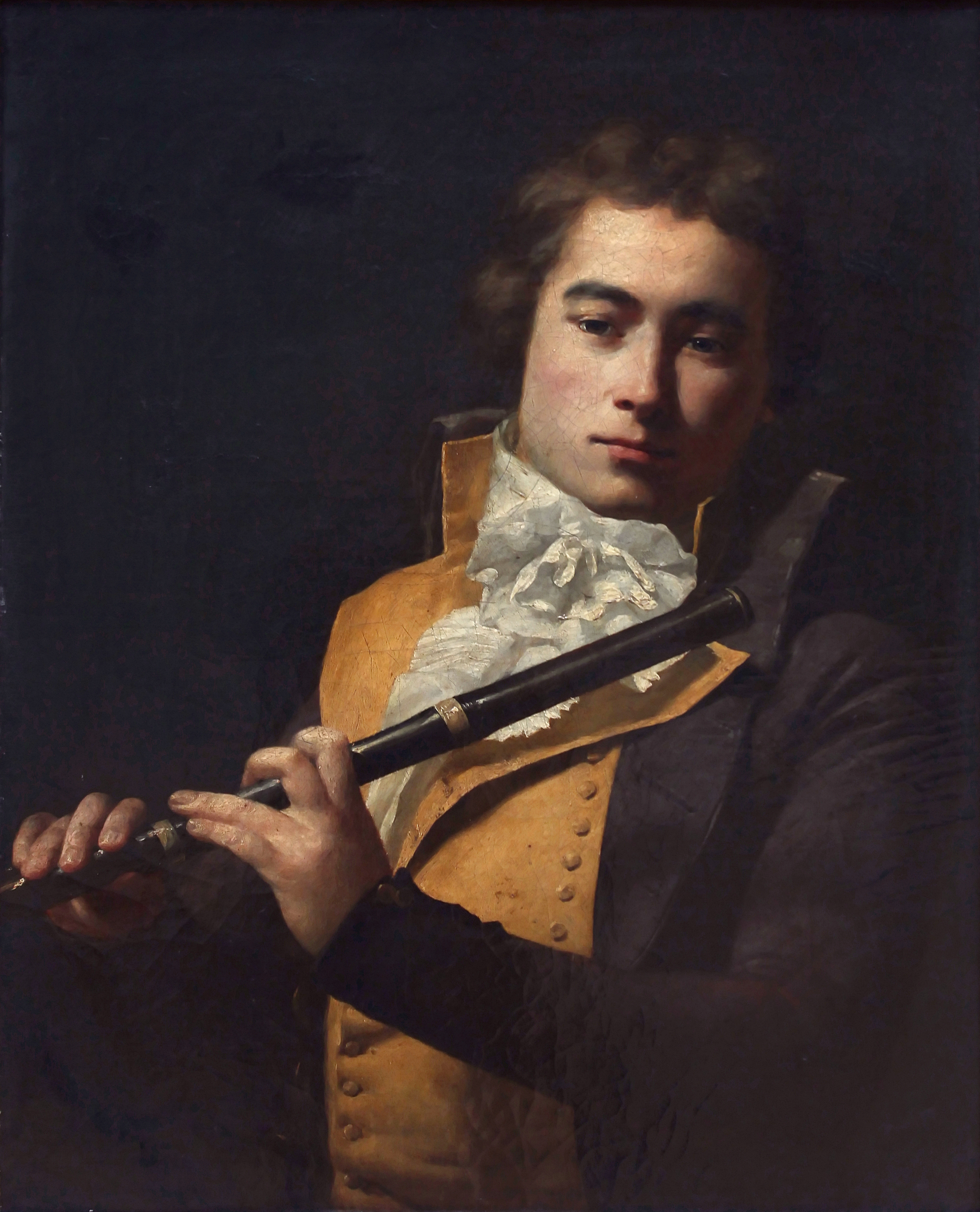
- Artist: Jacques-Louis David
- Year: 1792
- Medium: oil on canvas
- Dimensions: 75 cm × 59.5 cm (30 in × 23.4 in)
- Location: Royal Museums of Fine Arts of Belgium, Brussels

Portrait of Flutist François Devienne is a painting attributed to Jacques-Louis David, created around 1792. It portrays the French composer and flutist François Devienne (1759–1803), a prominent figure in late-18th-century Parisian music.

== Location ==
The painting is housed in the Royal Museums of Fine Arts of Belgium in Brussels.

== See also ==
- List of paintings by Jacques-Louis David
