= Portrait of Étienne Maurice Gérard =

Painting by Jacques-Louis David

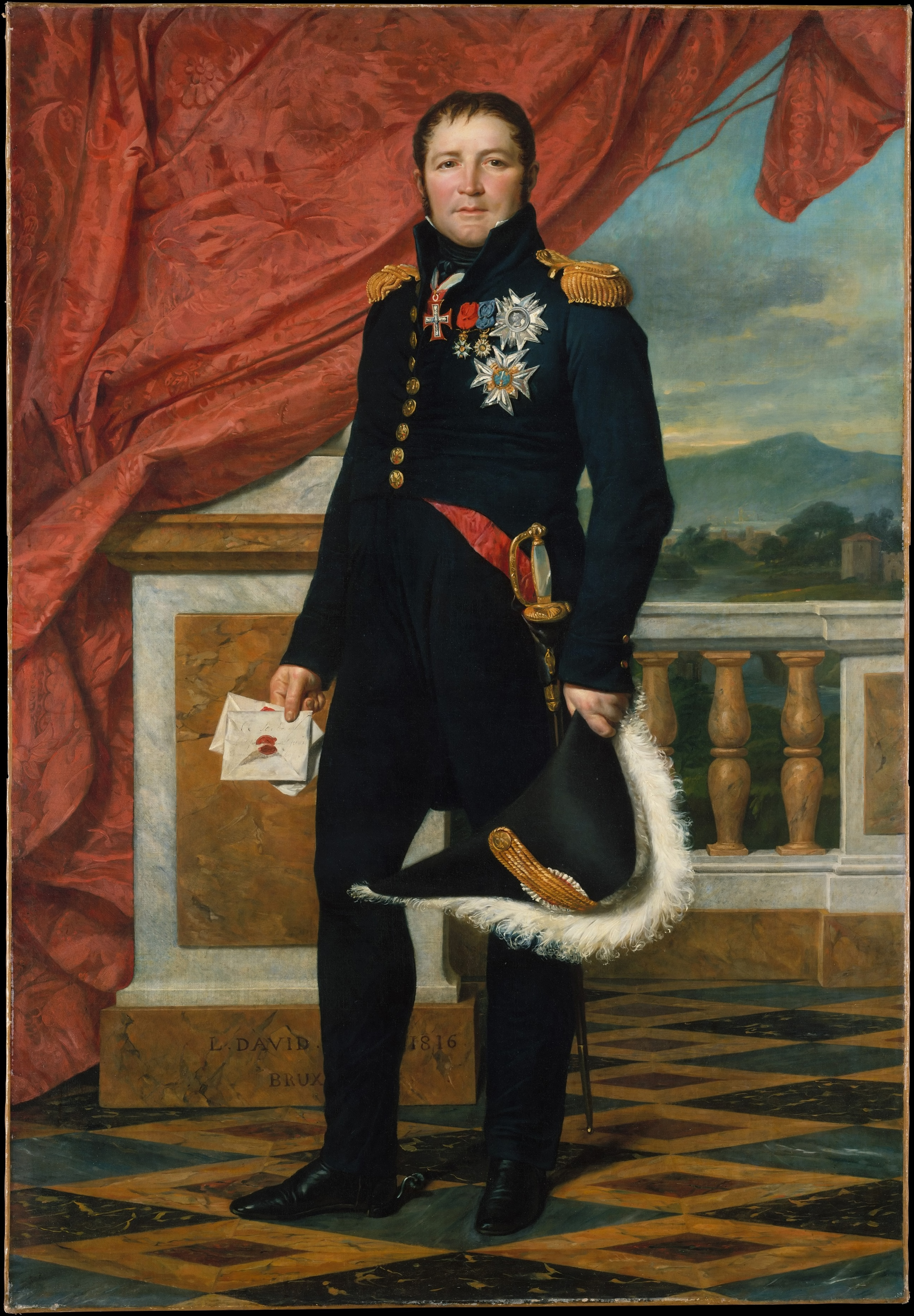
- Artist: Jacques-Louis David
- Year: 1816
- Type: Oil on canvas, portrait
- Dimensions: 196.9 cm × 135.9 cm (77.5 in × 53.5 in)
- Location: Metropolitan Museum of Art, New York

Portrait of Étienne Maurice Gérard is an 1816 portrait painting by the French artist Jacques-Louis David of Étienne Maurice Gérard, a general who distinguished himself during the Napoleonic Wars. Both men were strongly associated with the recently defeated Emperor Napoleon and had gone into exile in Brussels following the Bourbon Restoration. It was one of the first portraits David painted following his arrival in the city.

Gérard returned to France the following year and was promoted to Marshal. During the July Monarchy he commanded French troops intervening in Belgium and successfully besieged Antwerp in 1832. He also served as Minister of War and Prime Minister of France.

Gérard is shown in the dark-blue uniform of a general of the Empire and wears various decorations including the Legion of Honour. The Italianate background and chequerboard floor make no reference to his career. It may have been commissioned to celebrate the sitter's marriage to Rosemonde de Valence that year. Today the painting is in the Metropolitan Museum of Art in New York, having been acquired in 1965.

== See also ==
- List of paintings by Jacques-Louis David

== Bibliography ==
- Baetjer, Katharine. French Paintings in The Metropolitan Museum of Art from the Early Eighteenth Century through the Revolution. Metropolitan Museum of Art, 2019.
- Bordes, Phillipe. Jacques-Louis David: Empire to Exile. Yale University Press, 2007.
- Price, Munro. The Perilous Crown: France Between Revolutions, 1814-1848. Pan Macmillan, 2010.
