= Portrait of Madame François Buron =

Painting by Jacques-Louis David

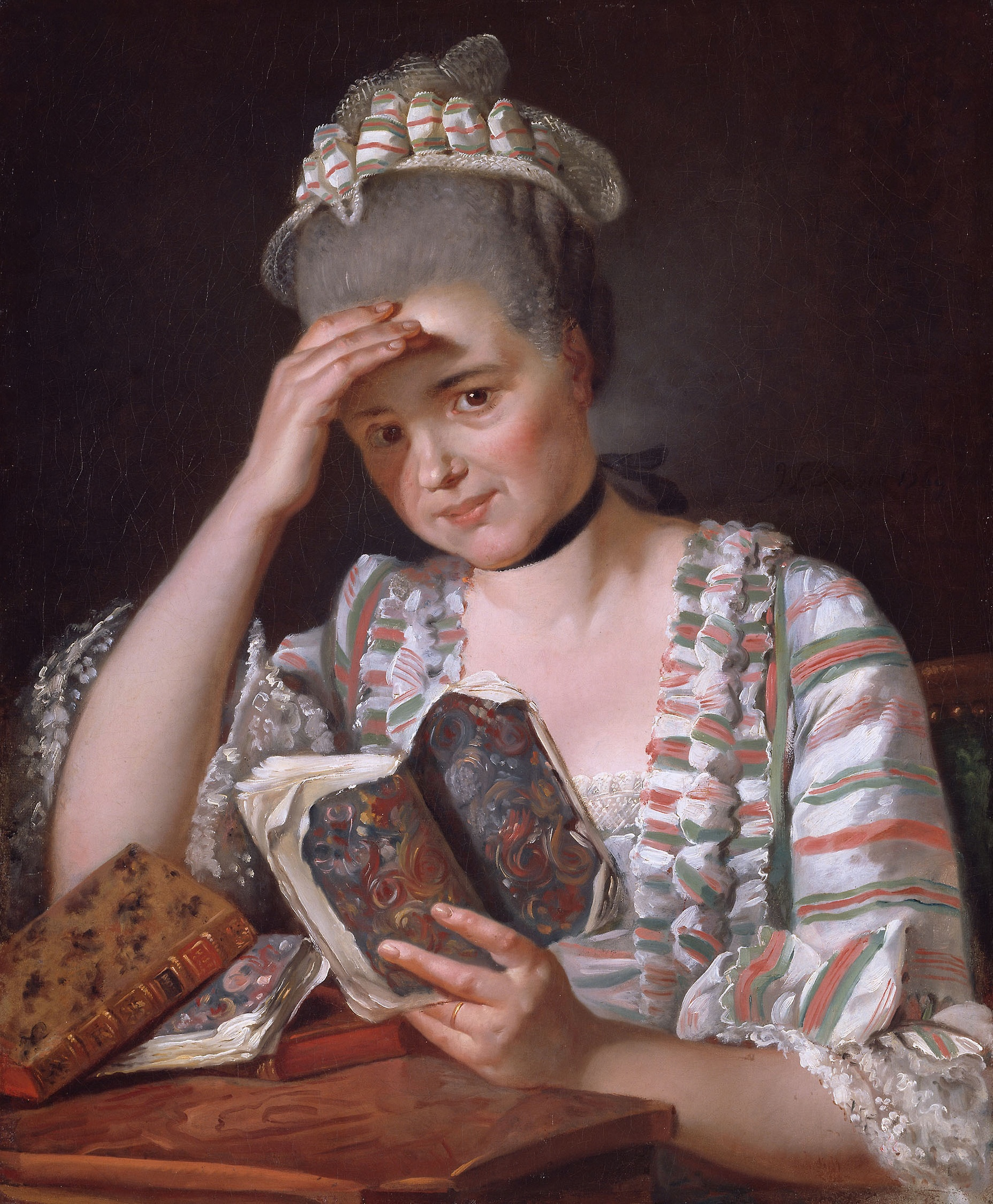
- Artist: Jacques-Louis David
- Year: 1769
- Medium: Oil on canvas
- Dimensions: 66.3 cm × 55 cm (26.1 in × 22 in)
- Location: Art Institute of Chicago, Chicago

Portrait of Madame François Buron is an oil-on-canvas painting created in 1769 by French artist Jacques-Louis David. The work depicts Madame François Buron, the wife of David's uncle, who was one of his early supporters.

== Description ==
In the portrait, Madame Buron is seated at a small table, holding a book with one hand and resting the other thoughtfully on her forehead. She wears a striped dress adorned with bows, rendered in fine detail, against a plain dark background. The composition emphasizes her calm, introspective expression and creates a sense of intimacy and immediacy.

== Provenance ==
The painting is part of the collection at the Art Institute of Chicago and remains a testament to the familial bonds that influenced David's early artistic path.

== See also ==
- List of paintings by Jacques-Louis David
