= Andromache Mourning Hector =

Painting by Jacques-Louis David

- La Douleur et les Regrets d'Andromaque sur le corps d'Hector son mari (French)
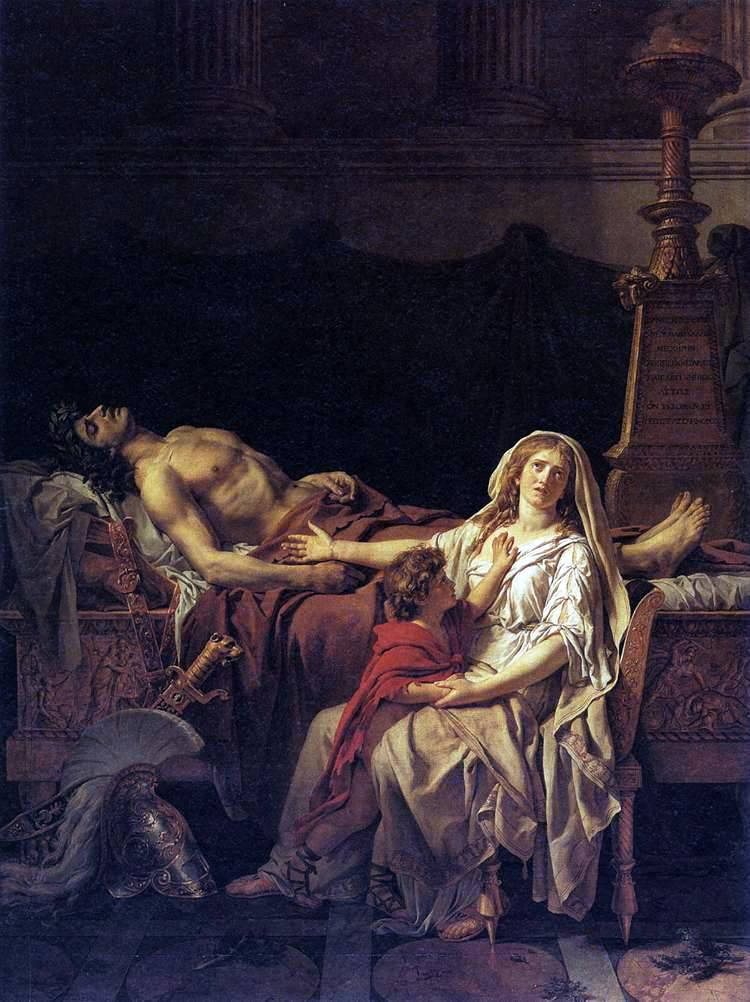
- Artist: Jacques-Louis David
- Year: 1783
- Medium: Oil on canvas
- Dimensions: 275 cm × 203 cm (108 in × 80 in)
- Location: Musée du Louvre, Paris

Andromache Mourning Hector is an oil painting on canvas of 1783 by the French Neoclassical artist Jacques-Louis David. The painting depicts an image from Homer's Iliad, showing Andromache, comforted by her son, Astyanax, mourning over her husband Hector, who has been killed by Achilles. This painting, presented on 23 August 1783, brought David election to the Académie Royale in 1784.

== See also ==
- List of paintings by Jacques-Louis David
