= The Loves of Paris and Helen =

Painting by Jacques-Louis David

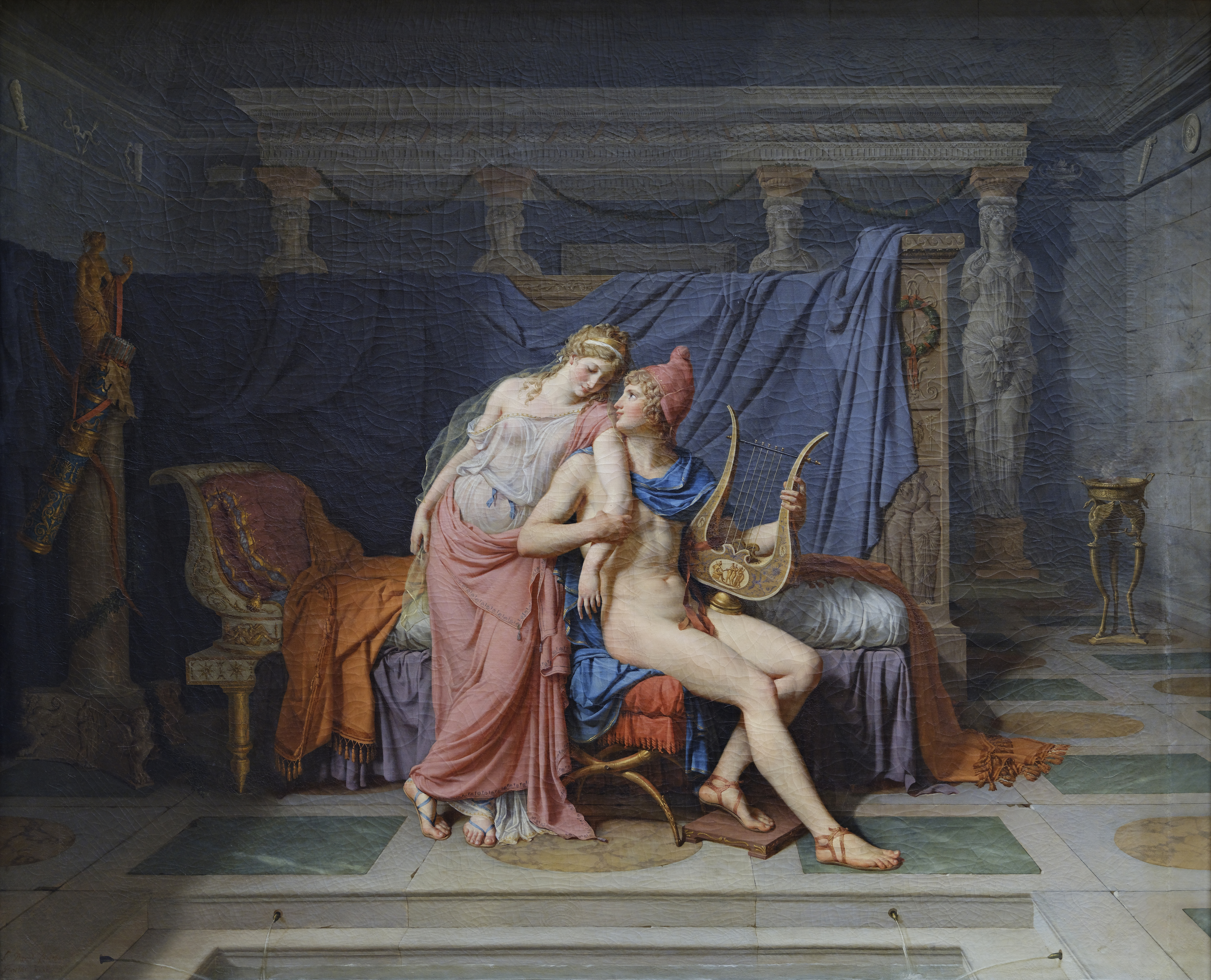
- Artist: Jacques-Louis David
- Year: 1788
- Medium: Oil on canvas
- Dimensions: 1.46 m × 1.81 m (57 in × 71 in)
- Location: Louvre, Paris
- Accession: INV 3696
- Website: collections.louvre.fr/en/ark:/53355/cl010063647

The Loves of Paris and Helen is a 1788 oil-on-canvas painting by the French Neoclassical artist Jacques-Louis David, showing Helen of Troy and Paris from Homer's Iliad. It is now in the Louvre Museum.

The painting was the result of a commission from the comte d'Artois. It shows David in his 'galante' phase and was interpreted as a satire on the manners of the comte d'Artois. The caryatids in the background are copies of those by Jean Goujon in the Louvre.

== See also ==
- List of paintings by Jacques-Louis David
