= The Anger of Achilles =

Painting by Jacques-Louis David

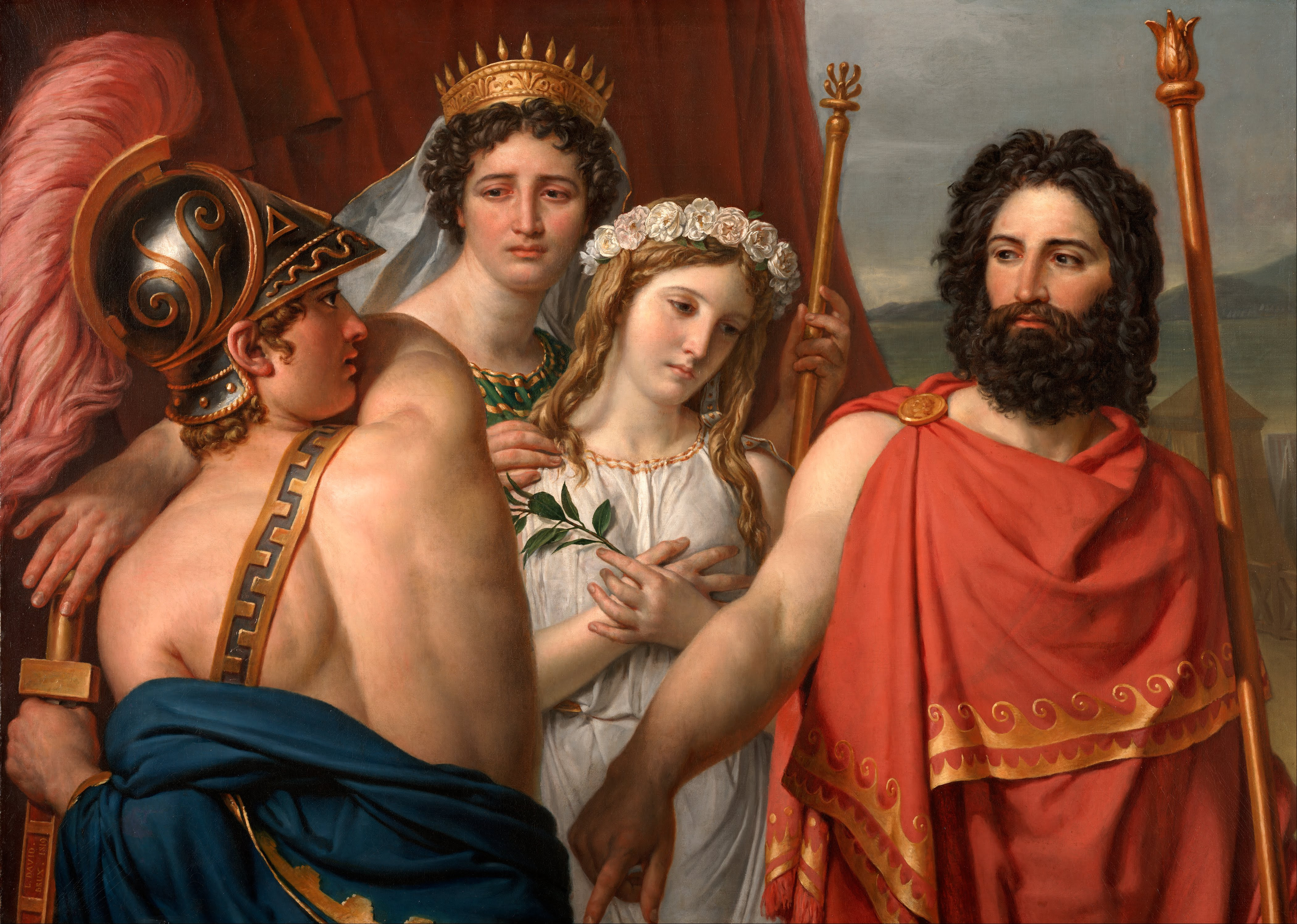
- Artist: Jacques-Louis David
- Year: 1818
- Medium: Oil on canvas
- Dimensions: 105 cm × 145 cm (41 in × 57 in)
- Location: Kimbell Art Museum, Texas

The Anger of Achilles is an oil-on-canvas painting of 1819 by the French artist Jacques-Louis David. It is in the collection of the Kimbell Art Museum, Fort Worth, Texas.

One of the last of David's history paintings, it shows the moment in Greek myth when Agamemnon reveals to Achilles that he has not actually brought his daughter Iphigenia to him as a bride, but rather intends to sacrifice her in order to appease the goddess Artemis. Achilles begins to draw his sword in anger upon hearing this, while Agamemnon's wife, Clytemnestra, looks on in grief and sadness with her hand on her daughter's shoulder.

David produced the work during his exile in Brussels. An 1825 copy of the painting is sometimes attributed to Michel Ghislain Stapleaux under David's direction. This copy is now in a private collection; according to ICIJ, it is owned through a British Virgin Islands-registered company by Russian media manager Konstantin Ernst.

== See also ==
- List of paintings by Jacques-Louis David

== Bibliography ==
- Antoine Schnapper (ed.) and Arlette Sérullaz, Jacques-Louis David 1748–1825 : catalogue de l'exposition rétrospective Louvre-Versailles 1989–1990, Paris, Réunion des Musées nationaux, 1989 (ISBN 2711823261)
- Sophie Monneret, David et le néoclassicisme, Paris, Terrail, 1998 (ISBN 2879391865)
- Simon Lee, David, Paris, Phaidon, 2002 (ISBN 0714891053)
- Philippe Bordes, David, Empire to Exile, New Haven, Yale University press, 2005 (ISBN 0-300-12346-9)
- Nicolas Sainte Fare Garnot, Jacques-Louis David 1748–1825 : Exposition du 4 octobre 2005 au 31 janvier 2006, Musée Jacquemart-André, Paris, Chaudun, 2005 (ISBN 2-35039-012-8)
