= The Three Women of Gand (painting) =

Painting by Jacques-Louis David

- Les trois dames de Gand (French)
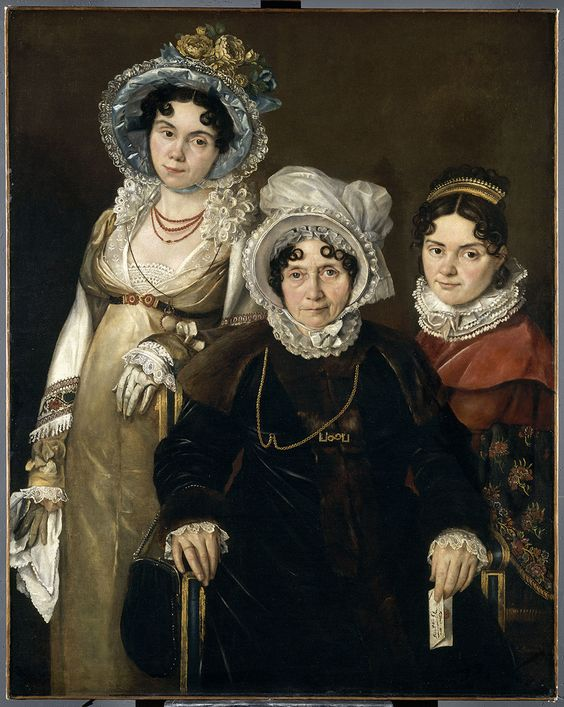
- Artist: workshop of Jacques-Louis David
- Year: 1812
- Medium: Oil on canvas
- Dimensions: 132 cm × 105 cm (52 in × 41 in)
- Location: Louvre Museum, Paris

The Three Women of Gand (French: Les trois dames de Gand) is an oil-on-canvas group portrait from the early 19th century, attributed to the circle or workshop of Jacques-Louis David (formerly attributed directly to the artist). The painting is dated to around 1812 and is part of the collection of the Musée du Louvre, Paris.
