= Erasistratus Discovering the Cause of Antiochus' Disease =

Painting by Jacques-Louis David

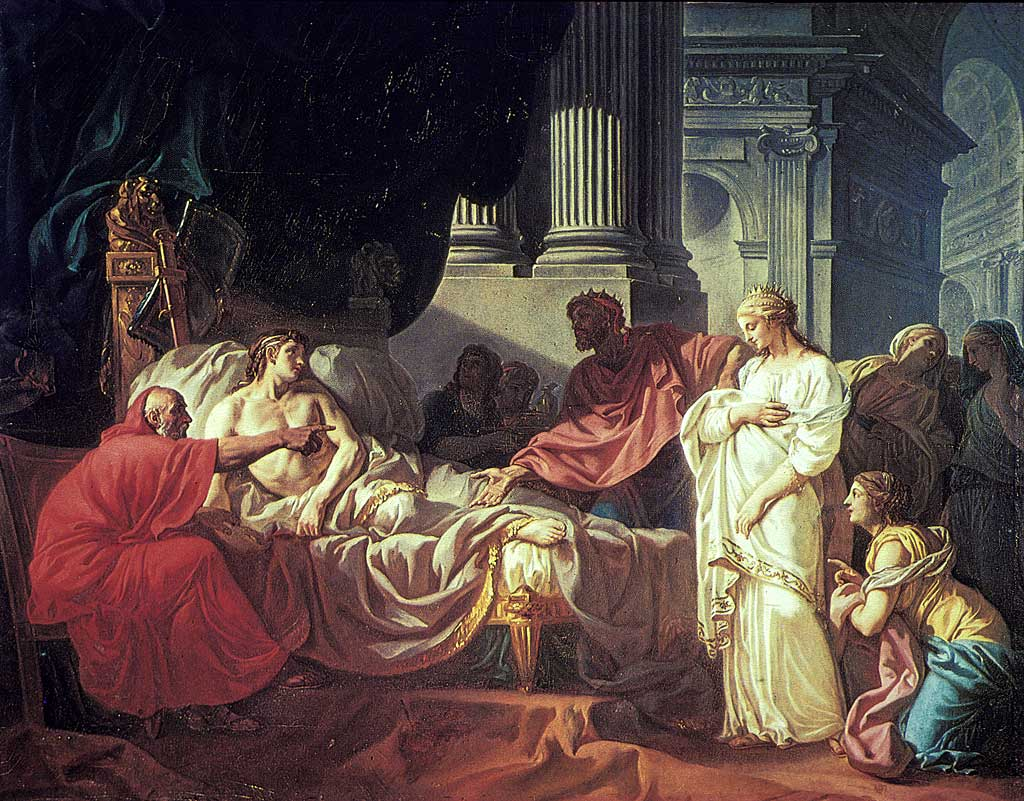
- Artist: Jacques-Louis David
- Year: 1774
- Medium: Oil on canvas
- Dimensions: 120 cm × 155 cm (47 in × 61 in)
- Location: Beaux-Arts de Paris, Paris

Erasistratus Discovering the Cause of Antiochus' Disease (French: Érasistrate découvrant la cause de la maladie d’Antiochius dans son amour pour Stratonice) is a 1774 oil painting by French neoclassical artist Jacques-Louis David. The work is a history painting depicting an episode from Plutarch's Lives in which Greek court physician Erasistratus diagnoses the illness of Antiochus, the son of Seleucus I, as lovesickness for his stepmother Stratonice. The painting was awarded the 1774 Prix de Rome by the Académie royale de peinture et de sculpture.

== Origin ==
Painting painted in 1774. After its presentation in the competition for the Prix de Rome, it was recovered by David and entrusted to Michel-Jean Sedaine. In the Sedaine family, the painting then passed into the collection of the Comte de Brissay, son-in-law of Sedaine. In 1860 the Imperial Household acquired it for 3000 francs, and it was installed at the National School of Fine Arts. The painting was restored in 1860 and 1981.

== The scene ==
Antiochus is bedridden, suffering from a sickly languor. His father, King Seleucus, is at the foot of the bed in the dark. To save his son, he called on the great physician Erasistratus.

The latter is beside him, taking his pulse: his left hand on Antiochus' wrist. The doctor asked that the women of the palace present themselves, one by one, before Antiochus. When Stratonice's turn comes, the young prince's pulse quickens, Erasistratus then raises his right hand, index finger pointing to the "cause of the disease".

Erasistratus convinced the king to give up the beautiful Stratonice to his son, and the prince recovers.

== See also ==
- List of paintings by Jacques-Louis David
