= Musées de Sens =

Musée de Sens
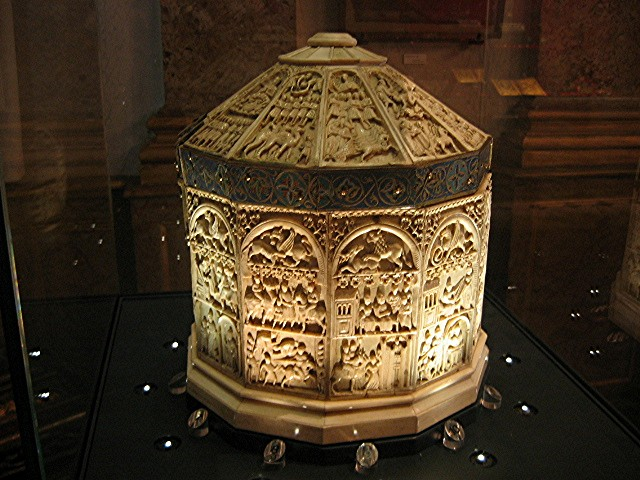
- The reliquary casket in Sens museum

- Location of the Musée de Sens within Burgundy region
- Established: 1985
- Location: 135, rue Déportés et de la Résistance 89100 Sens
- Coordinates: 48.1976609°N 3.2845606520174°E
- Type: Archaeological museum
- Visitors: 17,354 (2003) 18,915 (2004) 28,514 (2005) 29,114 (2006) 33,305 (2007)
- Website: Le site des musées de Bourgogne

The Musées de Sens are situated in the former Archbishops' palace of the town of Sens in the French department of Yonne, in Burgundy. Founded in the mid-nineteenth century, the museum now houses a rich collection of objects and works from all periods and brings together the collections of the Sens Archaeological Society, donations (including that of the family Marrey) and Treasury of Sens Cathedral.
