= Antoine Lavoisier =

French nobleman and chemist (1743–1794)

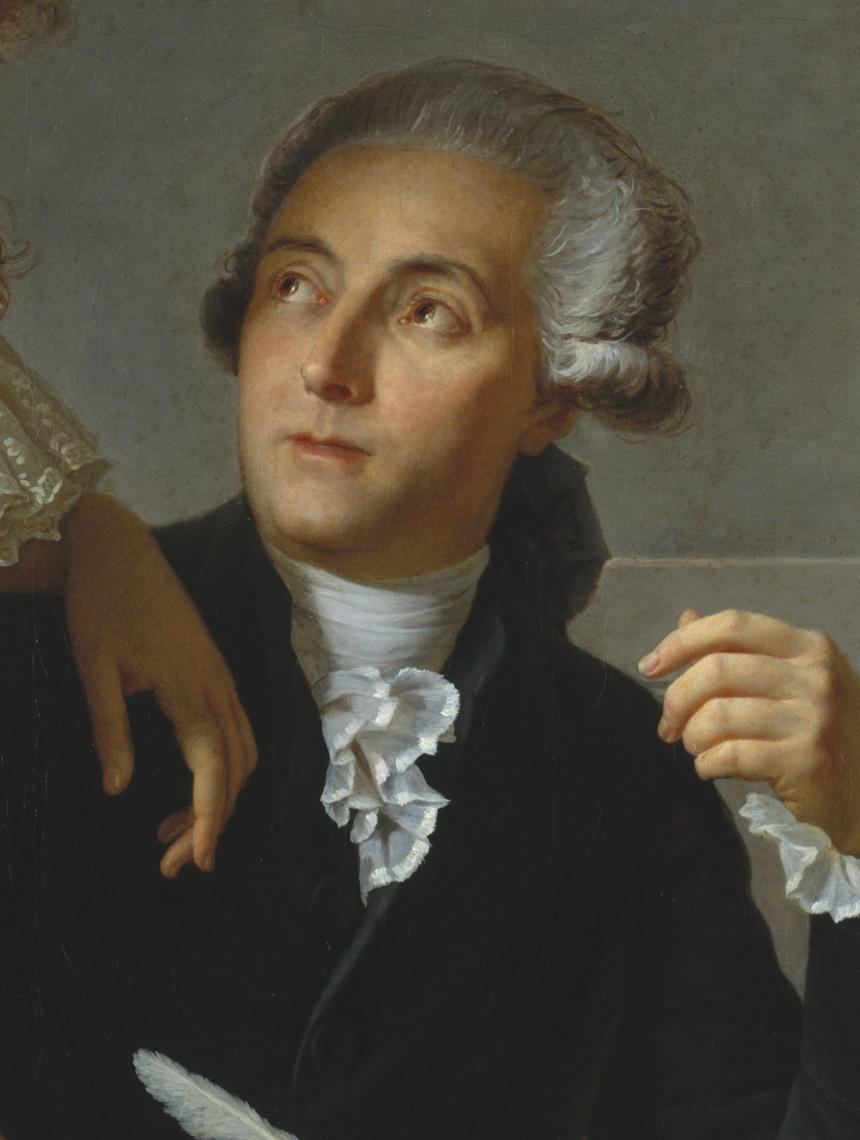
- Detail from Portrait of Antoine-Laurent Lavoisier and his Wife by Jacques-Louis David
- Born: Antoine-Laurent de Lavoisier; 26 August 1743; Paris, France
- Died: 8 May 1794 (aged 50); Paris, France
- Cause of death: Execution by guillotine
- Resting place: Catacombs of Paris
- Education: University of Paris
- Known for: Acids and bases; Combustion; Calorimetry; Carbon cycle; Elemental analysis; Gasometer; Identified oxygen; Identified hydrogen; Redox reactions; Stoichiometry; Law of conservation of mass; Thermochemistry
- Spouse: Marie-Anne Paulze Lavoisier (m. 1771)
- Scientific career
- Fields: Biologist, chemist
- Notable students: Éleuthère Irénée du Pont

Antoine-Laurent de Lavoisier (/ləˈvwɑːzieɪ/ lə-VWAH-zee-ay; French: [ɑ̃twan lɔʁɑ̃ də lavwazje]; 26 August 1743 – 8 May 1794), also Antoine Lavoisier after the French Revolution, was a French nobleman and chemist who was central to the 18th-century chemical revolution and who had a large influence on both the history of chemistry and the history of biology.

It is generally accepted that Lavoisier's great accomplishments in chemistry stem largely from his changing the science from a qualitative to a quantitative one.

Lavoisier is noted for his discovery of the role oxygen plays in combustion, opposing the prior phlogiston theory of combustion. He named oxygen (1778), recognizing it as an element, and also recognized hydrogen as an element (1783). By using more precise measurements than previous experimenters, he confirmed the developing theory that, although matter in a closed system may change its form or shape, its mass always remains the same (now known as the law of conservation of mass), which led to the development of the balanced physical and chemical reaction equations that are used today.

Lavoisier helped construct the metric system, wrote the first extensive list of elements, in which he predicted the existence of silicon, and helped to reform chemical nomenclature. (1787)

His wife and laboratory assistant, Marie-Anne Paulze Lavoisier, became a renowned chemist in her own right, and worked with him to develop the metric system of measurements.

Lavoisier was a powerful member of a number of aristocratic councils, and an administrator of the Ferme générale. The Ferme générale was one of the most hated components of the Ancien Régime because of the profits it took at the expense of the state, the secrecy of the terms of its contracts, and the violence of its armed agents. All of these political and economic activities enabled him to fund his scientific research. At the height of the French Revolution, he was charged with tax fraud and selling adulterated tobacco and was guillotined despite appeals to spare his life in recognition of his contributions to science. A year and a half later, he was exonerated by the French government.

== Biography ==
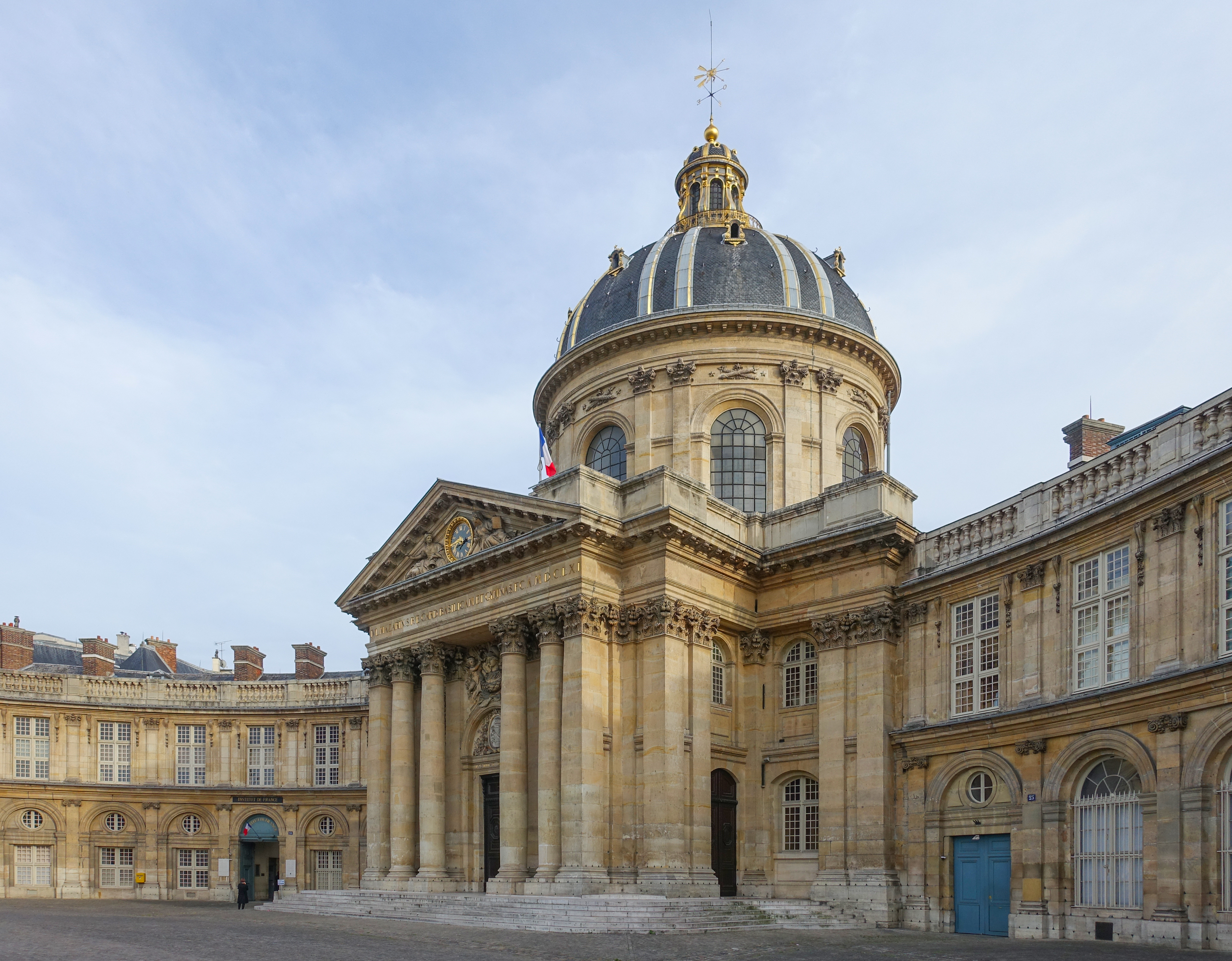
The Collège des Quatre-Nations in Paris

=== Early life and education ===
Antoine-Laurent Lavoisier was born to a wealthy family of the nobility in Paris on 26 August 1743. The son of an attorney at the Parlement of Paris, he inherited a large fortune at the age of five upon the death of his mother. Lavoisier began his schooling at the Collège des Quatre-Nations, University of Paris (also known as the Collège Mazarin) in Paris in 1754 at the age of 11. In his last two years (1760–1761) at the school, his scientific interests were aroused, and he studied chemistry, botany, astronomy, and mathematics. In the philosophy class he came under the tutelage of Abbé Nicolas Louis de Lacaille, a distinguished mathematician and observational astronomer who imbued the young Lavoisier with an interest in meteorological observation, an enthusiasm which never left him. Lavoisier entered the school of law, where he received a bachelor's degree in 1763 and a licentiate in 1764. Lavoisier received a law degree and was admitted to the bar, but never practiced as a lawyer. However, he continued his scientific education in his spare time.

=== Early scientific work ===
Lavoisier's education was filled with the ideals of the French Enlightenment of the time, and he was fascinated by Pierre Macquer's dictionary of chemistry. He attended lectures in the natural sciences. Lavoisier's devotion and passion for chemistry were largely influenced by Étienne Condillac, a prominent French scholar of the 18th century. His first chemical publication appeared in 1764. From 1763 to 1767, he studied geology under Jean-Étienne Guettard. In collaboration with Guettard, Lavoisier worked on a geological survey of Alsace–Lorraine in June 1767. In 1764 he read his first paper to the French Academy of Sciences, France's most elite scientific society, on the chemical and physical properties of gypsum (hydrated calcium sulfate), and in 1766 he was awarded a gold medal by the King for an essay on the problems of urban street lighting. In 1768 Lavoisier received a provisional appointment to the Academy of Sciences. In 1769, he worked on the first geological map of France.

=== Lavoisier as a social reformer ===
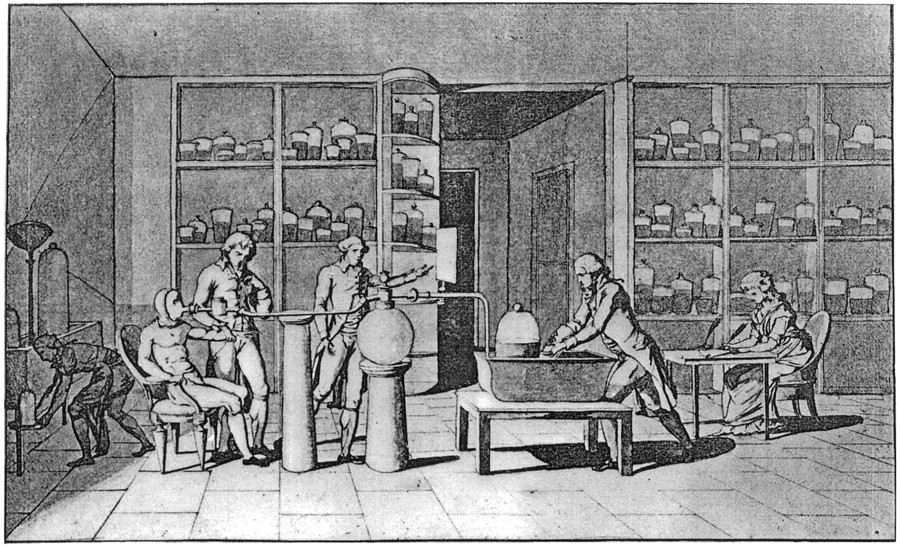
Lavoisier conducting an experiment on respiration in the 1770s

==== Research benefitting the public good ====
While Lavoisier is commonly known for his contributions to the sciences, he also dedicated a significant portion of his fortune and work toward benefitting the public. Lavoisier was a humanitarian—he cared deeply about the people in his country and often concerned himself with improving the livelihood of the population by agriculture, industry, and the sciences. The first instance of this occurred in 1765, when he submitted an essay on improving urban street lighting to the French Academy of Sciences.

Three years later in 1768, he focused on a new project to design an aqueduct. The goal was to bring water from the river Yvette into Paris so that the citizens could have clean drinking water. But, since the construction never commenced, he instead turned his focus to purifying the water from the Seine. This was the project that interested Lavoisier in the chemistry of water and public sanitation duties.

Additionally, he was interested in air quality and spent some time studying the health risks associated with gunpowder's effect on the air. In 1772, he performed a study on how to reconstruct the Hôtel-Dieu hospital, after it had been damaged by fire, in a way that would allow proper ventilation and clean air throughout.

At the time, the prisons in Paris were known to be largely unlivable and the prisoners' treatment inhumane. Lavoisier took part in investigations in 1780 (and again in 1791) on the hygiene in prisons and had made suggestions to improve living conditions, suggestions which were largely ignored.

Once a part of the academy, Lavoisier also held his own competitions to push the direction of research towards bettering the public and his own work.

==== Sponsorship of the sciences ====
Lavoisier had a vision of public education having roots in "scientific sociability" and philanthropy.

Lavoisier gained a vast majority of his income through buying stock in the General Farm, which allowed him to work on science full-time, live comfortably, and allowed him to contribute financially to better the community. (It would also contribute to his demise during the Reign of Terror many years later.)

It was very difficult to secure public funding for the sciences at the time, and additionally not very financially profitable for the average scientist, so Lavoisier used his wealth to open a very expensive and sophisticated laboratory in France so that aspiring scientists could study without the barriers of securing funding for their research.

He also pushed for public education in the sciences. He founded two organizations, Lycée and Musée des Arts et Métiers, which were created to serve as educational tools for the public. Funded by the wealthy and noble, the Lycée regularly taught courses to the public beginning in 1793.

=== Ferme générale and marriage ===
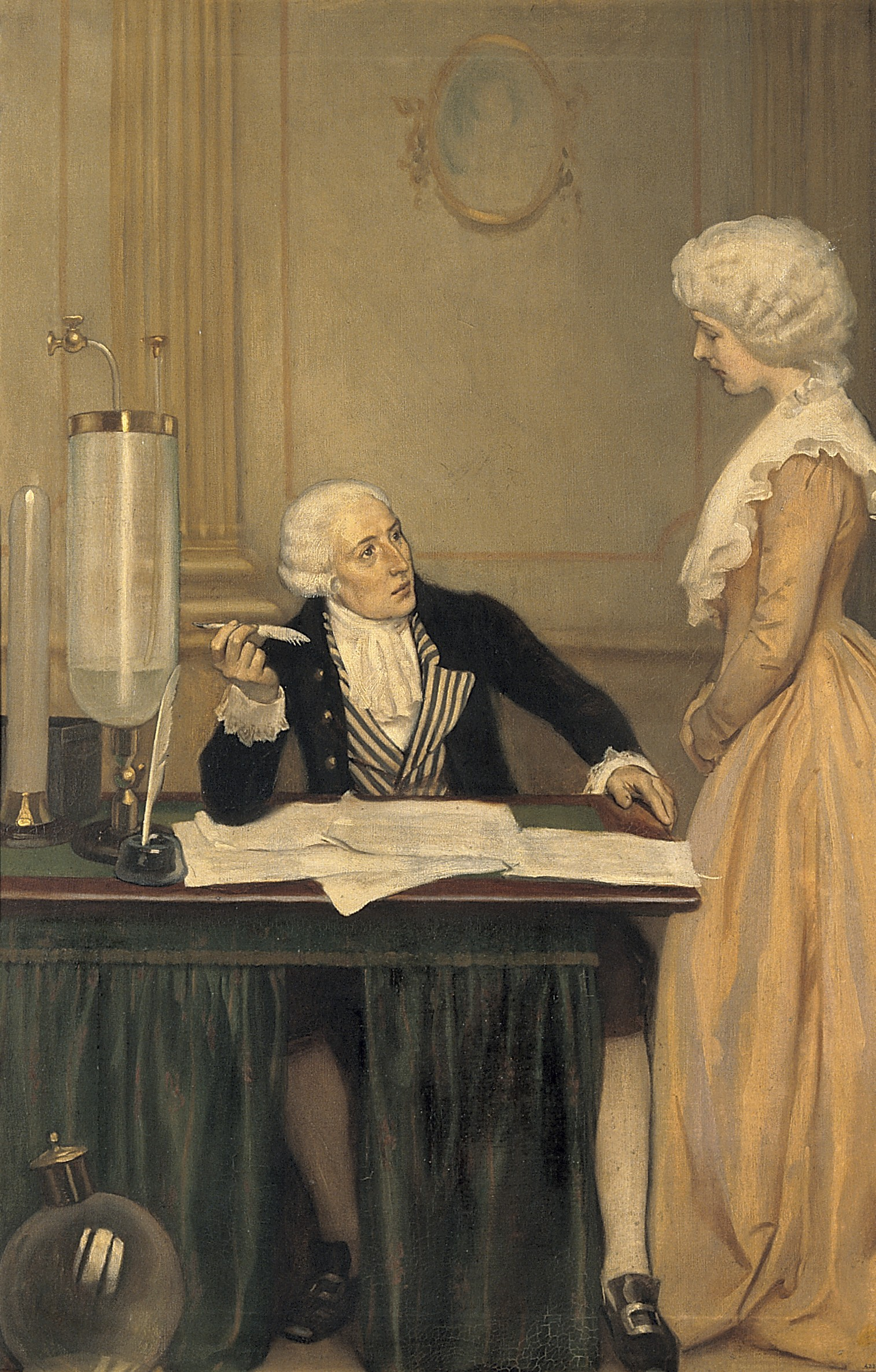
Portrait of Lavoisier explaining to his wife the result of his experiments on air by Ernest Board

At the age of 26, around the time he was elected to the Academy of Sciences, Lavoisier bought a share in the Ferme générale, a tax farming financial company which advanced the estimated tax revenue to the royal government in return for the right to collect the taxes. On behalf of the Ferme générale Lavoisier commissioned the building of a wall around Paris so that customs duties could be collected from those transporting goods into and out of the city. His participation in the collection of its taxes did not help his reputation when the Reign of Terror began in France, as taxes and poor government reform were the primary motivators during the French Revolution.

Lavoisier consolidated his social and economic position when, in 1771 at age 28, he married Marie-Anne Pierrette Paulze, the 13-year-old daughter of a senior member of the Ferme générale. She was to play an important part in Lavoisier's scientific career—notably, she translated English documents for him, including Richard Kirwan's Essay on Phlogiston and Joseph Priestley's research. In addition, she assisted him in the laboratory and created many sketches and carved engravings of the laboratory instruments used by Lavoisier and his colleagues for their scientific works. Madame Lavoisier edited and published Antoine's memoirs (whether any English translations of those memoirs have survived is unknown as of today) and hosted parties at which eminent scientists discussed ideas and problems related to chemistry.

A portrait of Antoine and Marie-Anne Lavoisier was painted by the famed artist Jacques-Louis David. Completed in 1788 on the eve of the Revolution, the painting was denied a customary public display at the Paris Salon for fear that it might inflame anti-aristocratic passions.

For three years following his entry into the Ferme générale, Lavoisier's scientific activity diminished somewhat, for much of his time was taken up with official Ferme générale business. He did, however, present one important memoir to the Academy of Sciences during this period, on the supposed conversion of water into earth by evaporation. By a very precise quantitative experiment, Lavoisier showed that the "earthy" sediment produced after long-continued reflux heating of water in a glass vessel was not due to a conversion of the water into earth but rather to the gradual disintegration of the inside of the glass vessel produced by the boiling water. He also attempted to introduce reforms in the French monetary and taxation system to help the peasants.

=== Adulteration of tobacco ===
The Farmers General held a monopoly of the production, import and sale of tobacco in France, and the taxes they levied on tobacco brought revenues of 30 million livres a year. This revenue began to fall because of a growing black market in tobacco that was smuggled and adulterated, most commonly with ash and water. Lavoisier devised a method of checking whether ash had been mixed in with tobacco: "When a spirit of vitriol, aqua fortis or some other acid solution is poured on ash, there is an immediate very intense effervescent reaction, accompanied by an easily detected noise."

Lavoisier also noticed that the addition of a small amount of ash improved the flavour of tobacco. Of one vendor selling adulterated goods, he wrote "His tobacco enjoys a very good reputation in the province... the very small proportion of ash that is added gives it a particularly pungent flavour that consumers look for. Perhaps the Farm could gain some advantage by adding a bit of this liquid mixture when the tobacco is fabricated." Lavoisier also found that while adding a lot of water to bulk the tobacco up would cause it to ferment and smell bad, the addition of a very small amount improved the product.

Thereafter the factories of the Farmers General added, as he recommended, a consistent 6.3% of water by volume to the tobacco they processed. To allow for this addition, the Farmers General delivered to retailers seventeen ounces of tobacco while only charging for sixteen. To ensure that only these authorised amounts were added, and to exclude the black market, Lavoisier saw to it that a watertight system of checks, accounts, supervision and testing made it very difficult for retailers to source contraband tobacco or to improve their profits by bulking it up.

He was energetic and rigorous in implementing this, and the systems he introduced were deeply unpopular with the tobacco retailers across the country. This unpopularity was to have consequences for him during the French Revolution.

=== Royal Commission on Agriculture ===
Lavoisier urged the establishment of a Royal Commission on Agriculture. He then served as its Secretary and spent considerable sums of his own money in order to improve the agricultural yields in the Sologne, an area where farmland was of poor quality. The humidity of the region often led to a blight of the rye harvest, causing outbreaks of ergotism among the population. In 1788 Lavoisier presented a report to the Commission detailing ten years of efforts on his experimental farm to introduce new crops and types of livestock. His conclusion was that despite the possibilities of agricultural reforms, the tax system left tenant farmers with so little that it was unrealistic to expect them to change their traditional practices.

=== Gunpowder Commission ===
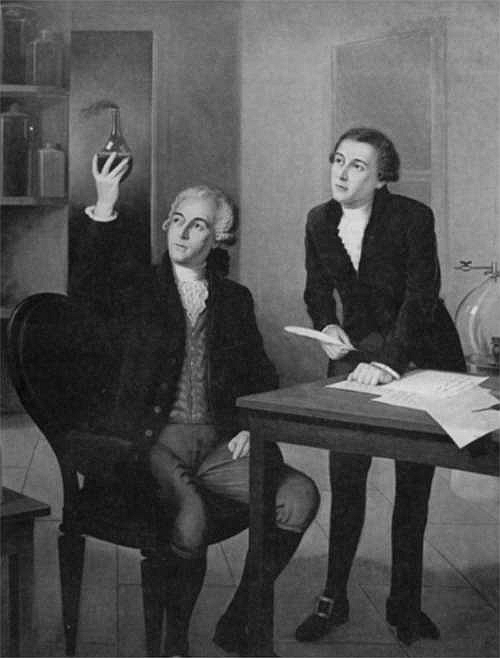
Éleuthère Irénée du Pont (right) and mentor Antoine Lavoisier

Lavoisier's researches on combustion were carried out in the midst of a very busy schedule of public and private duties, especially in connection with the Ferme Générale. There were also innumerable reports for and committees of the Academy of Sciences to investigate specific problems on order of the royal government. Lavoisier, whose organizing skills were outstanding, frequently landed the task of writing up such official reports. In 1775 he was made one of four commissioners of gunpowder appointed to replace a private company, similar to the Ferme Générale, which had proved unsatisfactory in supplying France with its munitions requirements. As a result of his efforts, both the quantity and quality of French gunpowder greatly improved, and it became a source of revenue for the government. His appointment to the Gunpowder Commission brought one great benefit to Lavoisier's scientific career as well. As a commissioner, he enjoyed both a house and a laboratory in the Royal Arsenal. Here he lived and worked between 1775 and 1792.

Lavoisier was a formative influence in the formation of the Du Pont gunpowder business because he trained Éleuthère Irénée du Pont, its founder, on gunpowder-making in France; the latter said that the Du Pont gunpowder mills "would never have been started but for his kindness to me."

=== During the Revolution ===
In June 1791, Lavoisier made a loan of 71,000 livres to Pierre Samuel du Pont de Nemours to buy a printing works so that du Pont could publish a newspaper, La Correspondance Patriotique. The plan was for this to include both reports of debates in the National Constituent Assembly as well as papers from the Academy of Sciences. The revolution quickly disrupted the elder du Pont's first newspaper, but his son E.I. du Pont soon launched Le Republicain and published Lavoisier's latest chemistry texts.

Lavoisier also chaired the commission set up to establish a uniform system of weights and measures which in March 1791 recommended the adoption of the metric system. The new system of weights and measures was adopted by the Convention on 1 August 1793. Lavoisier was one of the 27 Farmers General who, by order of the convention, were all to be detained. Although temporarily going into hiding, on 30 November 1793 he handed himself into the Port Royal convent for questioning. He claimed he had not operated on this commission for many years, having instead devoted himself to science.

Lavoisier himself was removed from the commission on weights and measures on 23 December 1793, together with mathematician Pierre-Simon Laplace and several other members, for political reasons.

One of his last major works was a proposal to the National Convention for the reform of French education. He also intervened on behalf of a number of foreign-born scientists including mathematician Joseph Louis Lagrange, helping to exempt them from a mandate stripping all foreigners of possessions and freedom.

=== Final days and execution ===
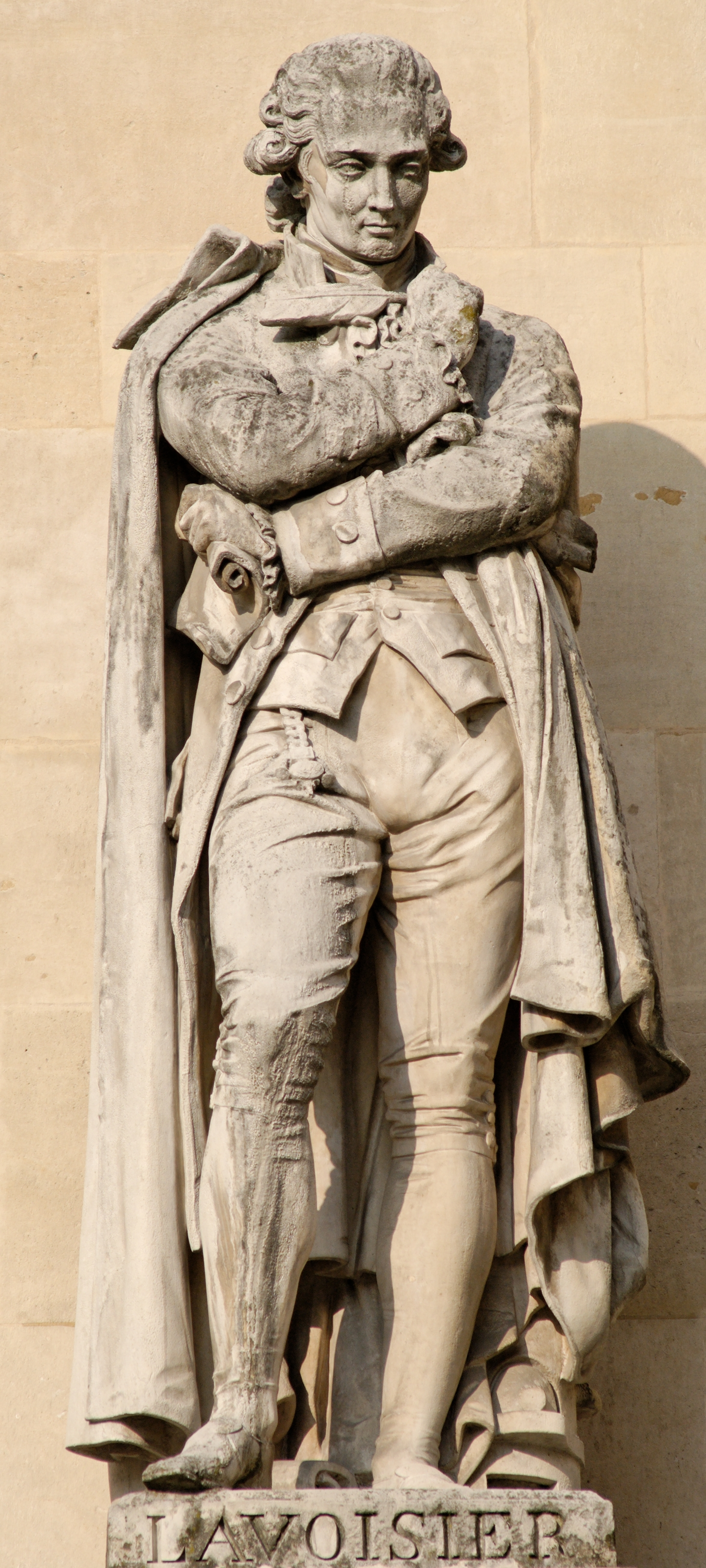
Lavoisier, by Jacques-Léonard Maillet, c. 1853, among culture heroes in the Louvre's Cour Napoléon

As the French Revolution gained momentum, attacks mounted on the deeply unpopular Ferme générale, and it was eventually abolished in March 1791. In 1792 Lavoisier was forced to resign from his post on the Gunpowder Commission and to move from his house and laboratory at the Royal Arsenal. On 8 August 1793, all the learned societies, including the Academy of Sciences, were suppressed at the request of Abbé Grégoire.

On 24 November 1793, the arrest of all the former tax farmers was ordered. Lavoisier and the other Farmers General faced nine accusations of defrauding the state of money owed to it, and of adding water to tobacco before selling it. Lavoisier drafted their defense, refuting the financial accusations, reminding the court of how they had maintained a consistently high quality of tobacco. The court, however, was inclined to believe that by condemning them and seizing the goods of the Farmers General, it would recover huge sums for the state. Lavoisier was convicted and guillotined on 8 May 1794 in Paris, at the age of 50, along with his 27 co-defendants.

According to popular legend, the appeal to spare his life, in order that he could continue his experiments, was cut short by the judge, Coffinhal: "La République n'a pas besoin de savants ni de chimistes; le cours de la justice ne peut être suspendu." ("The Republic needs neither scholars nor chemists; the course of justice cannot be delayed.") The judge Coffinhal himself would be executed less than three months later, in the wake of the Thermidorian reaction.

Lavoisier's importance to science was expressed by Lagrange who lamented the beheading by saying: "Il ne leur a fallu qu'un moment pour faire tomber cette tête, et cent années peut-être ne suffiront pas pour en reproduire une semblable." ("It took them only an instant to cut off this head, and a hundred years might not be enough to reproduce someone similar.")

==== Exoneration ====
A year and a half after his execution, Lavoisier was completely exonerated by the French government. During the White Terror, his belongings were delivered to his widow. A brief note was included, reading "To the widow of Lavoisier, who was falsely convicted".

==== Blinking experiment ====
An apocryphal story exists regarding Lavoisier's execution in which the scientist blinked his eyes to demonstrate that the head retained some consciousness after being severed. Some variants of the story include Joseph-Louis Lagrange as being the scientist to observe and record Lavoisier's blinking. This story was not recorded in contemporary accounts of Lavoisier's death, and the execution site was too removed from the public for Lagrange to have viewed Lavoisier's alleged experiment. The story likely originated in a 1990s Discovery Channel documentary about guillotines and then subsequently spread online, becoming what one source describes as an urban legend.

== Contributions to chemistry ==
=== Oxygen theory of combustion ===
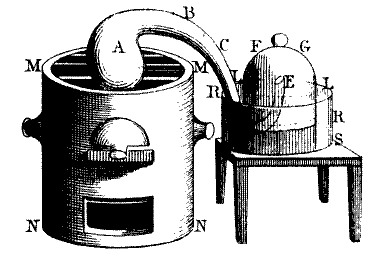
Antoine Lavoisier's phlogiston experiment. Engraving by Mme Lavoisier in the 1780s taken from Traité Élémentaire de Chimie (Elementary treatise on chemistry)

Contrary to prevailing thought at the time, Lavoisier theorized that common air, or one of its components, combines with substances when they are burned. He demonstrated this through experiment.

During late 1772 Lavoisier turned his attention to the phenomenon of combustion, the topic on which he was to make his most significant contribution to science. He reported the results of his first experiments on combustion in a note to the Academy on 20 October, in which he reported that when phosphorus burned, it combined with a large quantity of air to produce acid spirit of phosphorus, and that the phosphorus increased in weight on burning. In a second sealed note deposited with the academy a few weeks later (1 November) Lavoisier extended his observations and conclusions to the burning of sulfur and went on to add that "what is observed in the combustion of sulfur and phosphorus may well take place in the case of all substances that gain in weight by combustion and calcination: and I am persuaded that the increase in weight of metallic calces is due to the same cause."

==== Joseph Black's "fixed air" ====
During 1773 Lavoisier determined to review thoroughly the literature on air, particularly "fixed air," and to repeat many of the experiments of other workers in the field. He published an account of this review in 1774 in a book entitled Opuscules physiques et chimiques (Physical and Chemical Essays). In the course of this review, he made his first full study of the work of Joseph Black, the Scottish chemist who had carried out a series of classic quantitative experiments on the mild and caustic alkalies. Black had shown that the difference between a mild alkali, for example, chalk (CaCO_{3}), and the caustic form, for example, quicklime (CaO), lay in the fact that the former contained "fixed air," not common air fixed in the chalk, but a distinct chemical species, now understood to be carbon dioxide (CO_{2}), which was a constituent of the atmosphere. Lavoisier recognized that Black's fixed air was identical with the air evolved when metal calces were reduced with charcoal and even suggested that the air which combined with metals on calcination and increased the weight might be Black's fixed air, that is, CO_{2}.

==== Joseph Priestley ====
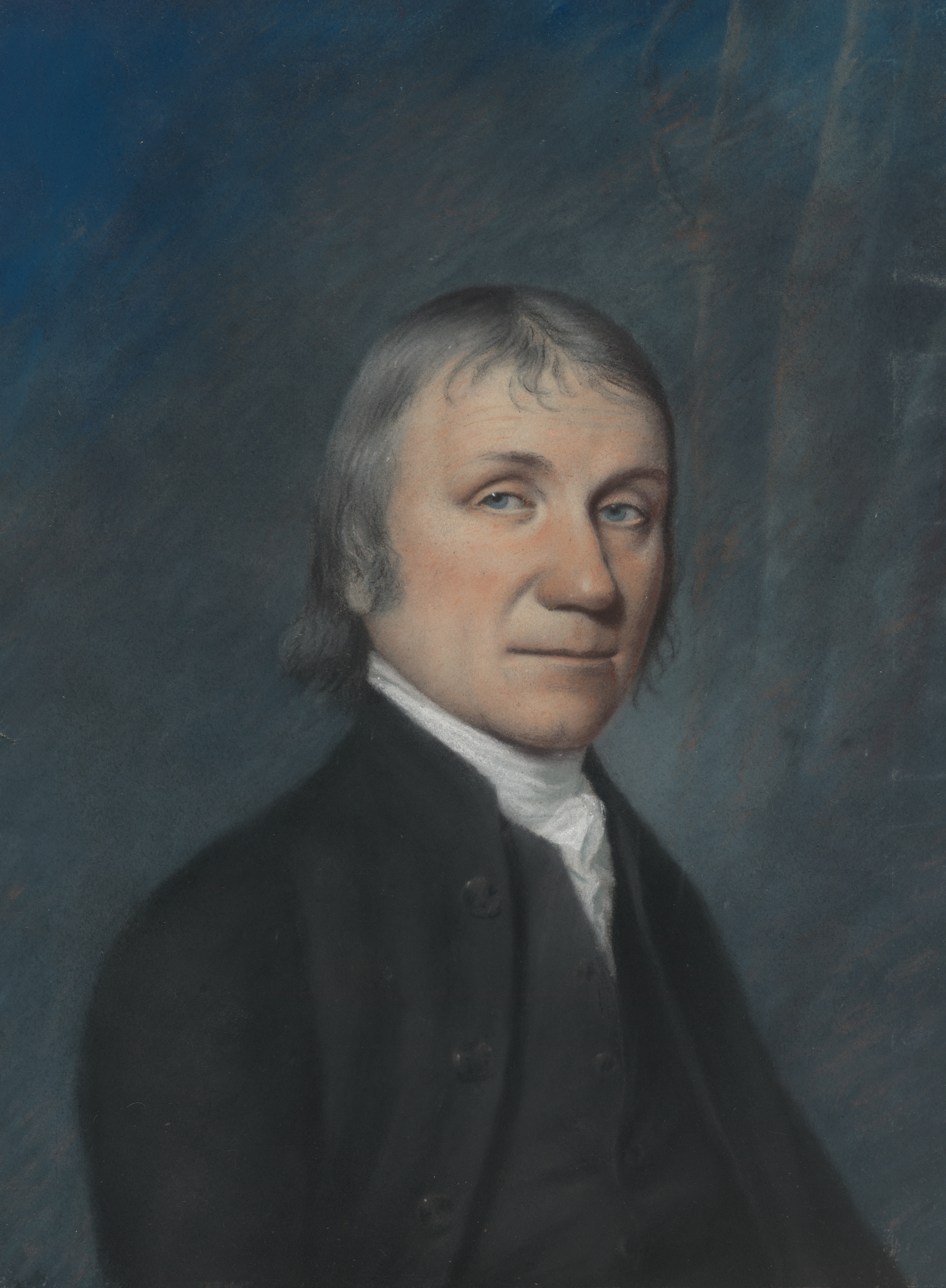
Joseph Priestley, an English chemist known for isolating oxygen, which he termed "dephlogisticated air"

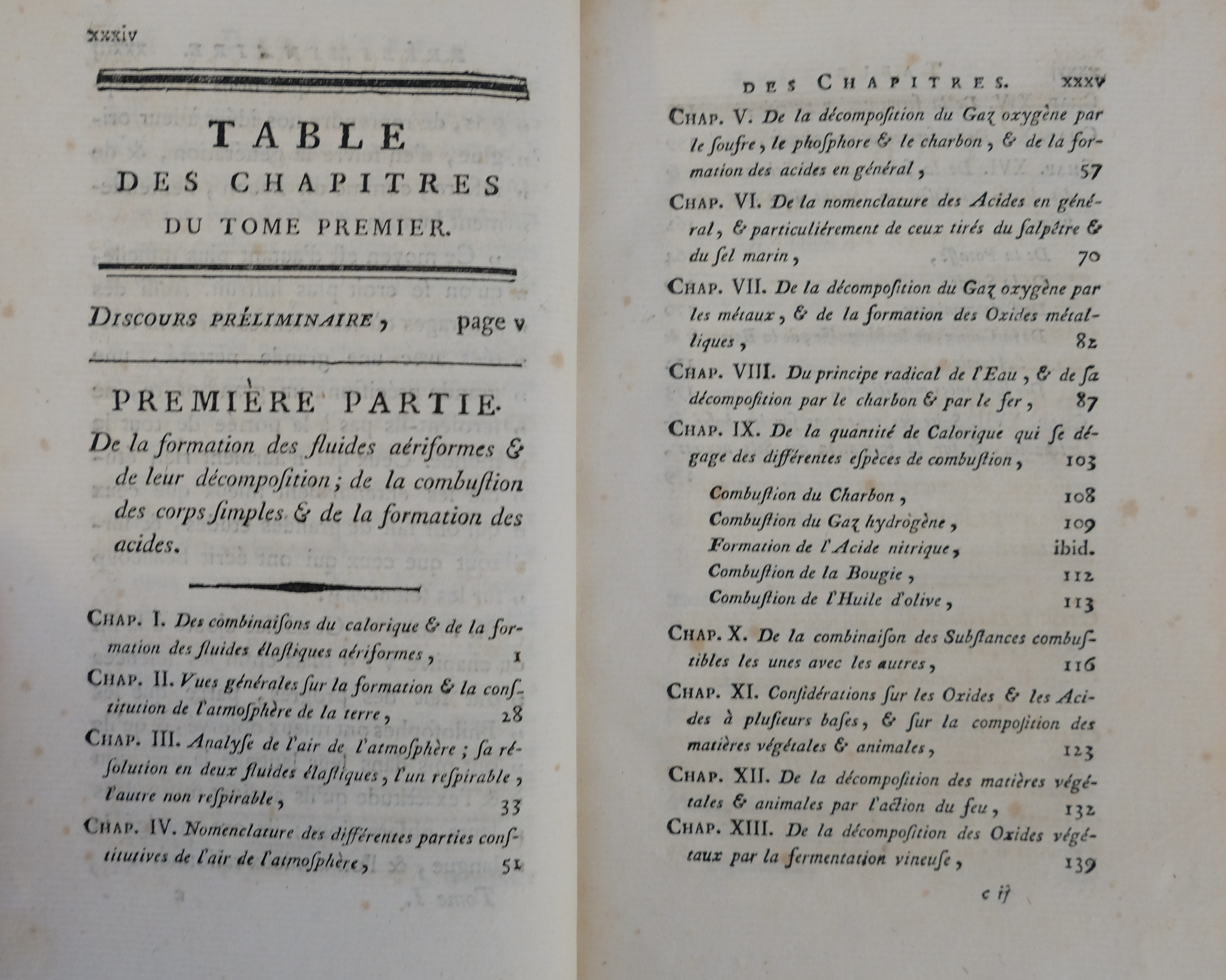
Table of contents to volumes 1 of "Traité élémentaire de Chimie" (1789)

In the spring of 1774, Lavoisier carried out experiments on the calcination of tin and lead in sealed vessels, the results of which conclusively confirmed that the increase in weight of metals in combustion was due to combination with air. But the question remained about whether it was in combination with common atmospheric air or with only a part of atmospheric air. In October the English chemist Joseph Priestley visited Paris, where he met Lavoisier and told him of the air which he had produced by heating the red calx of mercury with a burning glass and which had supported combustion with extreme vigor. Priestley at this time was unsure of the nature of this gas, but he felt that it was an especially pure form of common air. Lavoisier carried out his own research on this peculiar substance. The result was his memoir On the Nature of the Principle Which Combines with Metals during Their Calcination and Increases Their Weight, read to the Academy on 26 April 1775 (commonly referred to as the Easter Memoir). In the original memoir, Lavoisier showed that the mercury calx was a true metallic calx in that it could be reduced with charcoal, giving off Black's fixed air in the process. When reduced without charcoal, it gave off an air which supported respiration and combustion in an enhanced way. He concluded that this was just a pure form of common air and that it was the air itself "undivided, without alteration, without decomposition" which combined with metals on calcination.

After returning from Paris, Priestley took up once again his investigation of the air from mercury calx. His results now showed that this air was not just an especially pure form of common air but was "five or six times better than common air, for the purpose of respiration, inflammation, and ... every other use of common air". He called the air dephlogisticated air, as he thought it was common air deprived of its phlogiston. Since it was therefore in a state to absorb a much greater quantity of phlogiston given off by burning bodies and respiring animals, the greatly enhanced combustion of substances and the greater ease of breathing in this air were explained.

=== Pioneer of stoichiometry ===
Lavoisier's researches included some of the first truly quantitative chemical experiments. He carefully weighed the reactants and products of a chemical reaction in a sealed glass vessel so that no gases could escape, which was a crucial step in the advancement of chemistry. In 1774, he showed that, although matter can change its state in a chemical reaction, the total mass of matter is the same at the end as at the beginning of every chemical change. Thus, for instance, if a piece of wood is burned to ashes, the total mass remains unchanged if gaseous reactants and products are included. Lavoisier's experiments supported the law of conservation of mass. In France it is taught as Lavoisier's Law and is paraphrased from a statement in his Traité Élémentaire de Chimie: "Nothing is lost, nothing is created, everything is transformed." Mikhail Lomonosov (1711–1765) had previously expressed similar ideas in 1748 and proved them in experiments; others whose ideas pre-date the work of Lavoisier include Jean Rey (1583–1645), Joseph Black (1728–1799), and Henry Cavendish (1731–1810).

=== Chemical nomenclature ===
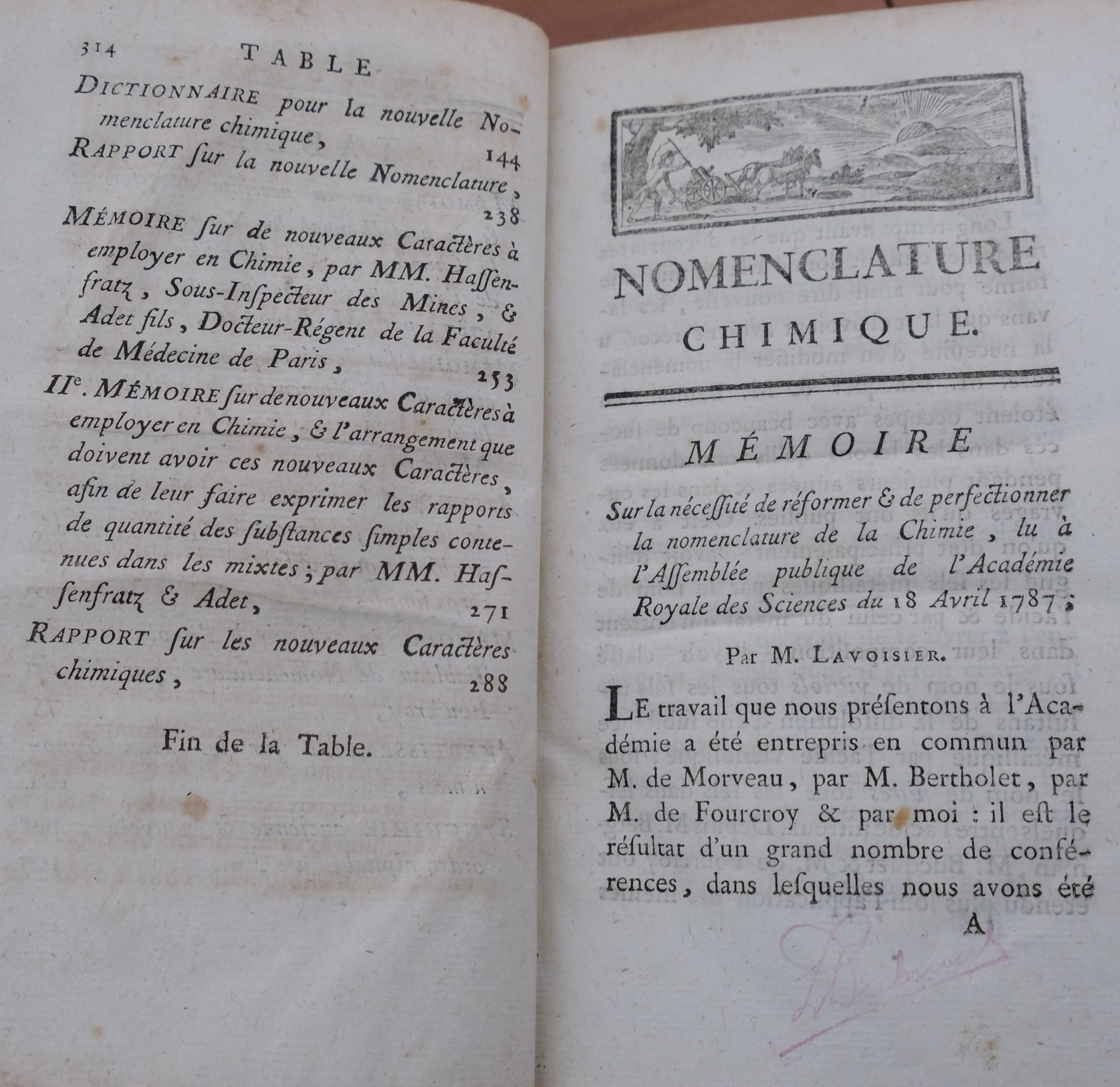
First page of a 1787 copy of "Méthode de Nomenclature Chimique"

Lavoisier, together with Louis-Bernard Guyton de Morveau, Claude-Louis Berthollet, and Antoine François de Fourcroy, submitted a new program for the reforms of chemical nomenclature to the academy in 1787, for there was virtually no rational system of chemical nomenclature at this time. This work, titled Méthode de nomenclature chimique (Method of Chemical Nomenclature, 1787), introduced a new system which was tied inextricably to Lavoisier's new oxygen theory of chemistry.

The classical elements of earth, air, fire, and water were discarded, and instead some 33 substances which could not be decomposed into simpler substances by any known chemical means were provisionally listed as elements. The elements included light; caloric (matter of heat); the principles of oxygen, hydrogen, and azote (nitrogen); carbon; sulfur; phosphorus; the yet unknown "radicals" of muriatic acid (hydrochloric acid), boric acid, and "fluoric" acid; 17 metals; 5 earths (mainly oxides of yet unknown metals such as magnesia, baria, and strontia); three alkalies (potash, soda, and ammonia); and the "radicals" of 19 organic acids.

The acids, regarded in the new system as compounds of various elements with oxygen, were given names which indicated the element involved together with the degree of oxygenation of that element, for example sulfuric and sulfurous acids, phosphoric and phosphorous acids, nitric and nitrous acids, the "ic" termination indicating acids with a higher proportion of oxygen than those with the "ous" ending.

Similarly, salts of the "ic" acids were given the terminal letters "ate," as in copper sulfate, whereas the salts of the "ous" acids terminated with the suffix "ite," as in copper sulfite.

The total effect of the new nomenclature can be gauged by comparing the new name "copper sulfate" with the old term "vitriol of Venus." Lavoisier's new nomenclature spread throughout Europe and to the United States and became common use in the field of chemistry. This marked the beginning of the anti-phlogistic approach to the field.

=== Chemical revolution and opposition ===
Lavoisier is commonly cited as a central contributor to the chemical revolution. His precise measurements and meticulous keeping of balance sheets throughout his experiment were vital to the widespread acceptance of the law of conservation of mass. His introduction of new terminology, a binomial system modeled after that of Linnaeus, also helps to mark the dramatic changes in the field which are referred to generally as the chemical revolution. Lavoisier encountered much opposition in trying to change the field, especially from British phlogistic scientists. Joseph Priestley, Richard Kirwan, James Keir, and William Nicholson, among others, argued that quantification of substances did not imply conservation of mass. Rather than reporting factual evidence, opposition claimed Lavoisier was misinterpreting the implications of his research. One of Lavoisier's allies, Jean Baptiste Biot, wrote of Lavoisier's methodology, "one felt the necessity of linking accuracy in experiments to rigor of reasoning." His opposition argued that precision in experimentation did not imply precision in inferences and reasoning. Despite opposition, Lavoisier continued to use precise instrumentation to convince other chemists of his conclusions, often results to five to eight decimal places. Nicholson, who estimated that only three of these decimal places were meaningful, stated:

If it be denied that these results are pretended to be true in the last figures, I must beg leave to observe, that these long rows of figures, which in some instances extend to a thousand times the nicety of experiment, serve only to exhibit a parade which true science has no need of: and, more than this, that when the real degree of accuracy in experiments is thus hidden from our contemplation, we are somewhat disposed to doubt whether the exactitude scrupuleuse of the experiments be indeed such as to render the proofs de l'ordre demonstratif.

== Notable works ==
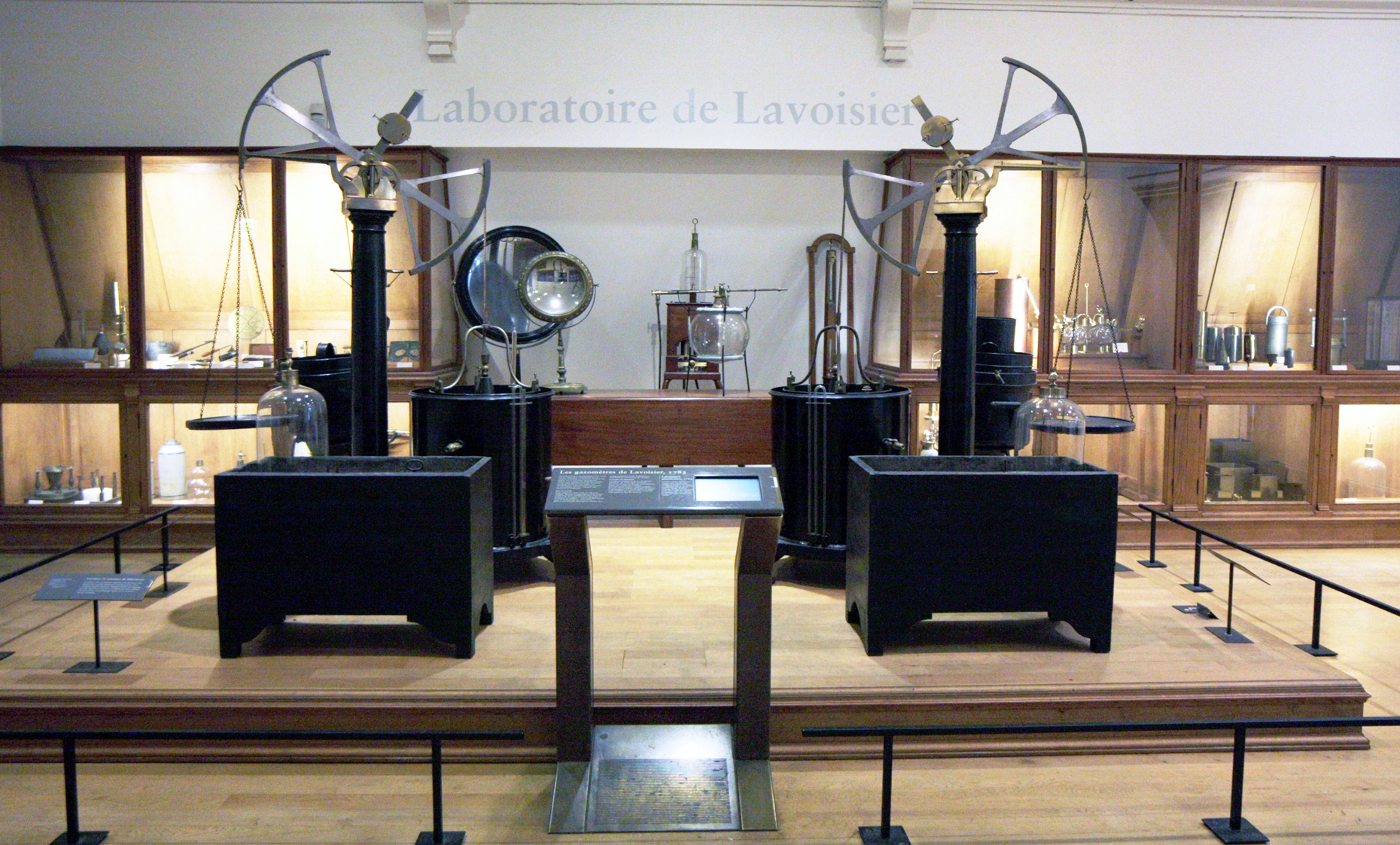
Lavoisier's laboratory, Musée des Arts et Métiers, Paris

=== Easter memoir ===
The "official" version of Lavoisier's Easter Memoir appeared in 1778. In the intervening period, Lavoisier had ample time to repeat some of Priestley's latest experiments and perform some new ones of his own. In addition to studying Priestley's dephlogisticated air, he studied more thoroughly the residual air after metals had been calcined. He showed that this residual air supported neither combustion nor respiration and that approximately five volumes of this air added to one volume of the dephlogisticated air gave common atmospheric air. Common air was then a mixture of two distinct chemical species with quite different properties. Thus when the revised version of the Easter Memoir was published in 1778, Lavoisier no longer stated that the principle which combined with metals on calcination was just common air but "nothing else than the healthiest and purest part of the air" or the "eminently respirable part of the air". The same year he coined the name oxygen for this constituent of the air, from the Greek words meaning "acid former". He was struck by the fact that the combustion products of such nonmetals as sulfur, phosphorus, charcoal, and nitrogen were acidic. He held that all acids contained oxygen and that oxygen was therefore the acidifying principle.

=== Dismantling phlogiston theory ===
Lavoisier's chemical research between 1772 and 1778 was largely concerned with developing his own new theory of combustion. In 1783 he read to the academy his paper entitled Réflexions sur le phlogistique (Reflections on Phlogiston), a full-scale attack on the current phlogiston theory of combustion. That year Lavoisier also began a series of experiments on the composition of water which were to prove an important capstone to his combustion theory and win many converts to it. Many investigators had been experimenting with the combination of Henry Cavendish's inflammable air, now known as hydrogen, with "dephlogisticated air" (air in the process of combustion, now known to be oxygen) by electrically sparking mixtures of the gases. All of the researchers noted Cavendish's production of pure water by burning hydrogen in oxygen, but they interpreted the reaction in varying ways within the framework of phlogiston theory. Lavoisier learned of Cavendish's experiment in June 1783 via Charles Blagden (before the results were published in 1784), and immediately recognized water as the oxide of a "hydrogenerative" gas.

In cooperation with Laplace, Lavoisier synthesized water by burning jets of hydrogen and oxygen in a bell jar over mercury. The quantitative results were good enough to support the contention that water was not an element, as had been thought for over 2,000 years, but a compound of two gases, hydrogen and oxygen. The interpretation of water as a compound explained the inflammable air generated from dissolving metals in acids (hydrogen produced when water decomposes) and the reduction of calces by inflammable air (a combination of gas from calx with hydrogen to form water).

Despite these experiments, Lavoisier's antiphlogistic approach remained unaccepted by many other chemists. Lavoisier labored to provide definitive proof of the composition of water, attempting to use this in support of his theory. Working with Jean-Baptiste Meusnier, Lavoisier passed water through a red-hot iron gun barrel, allowing the oxygen to form an oxide with the iron and the hydrogen to emerge from the end of the pipe. He submitted his findings of the composition of water to the Académie des Sciences in April 1784, reporting his figures to eight decimal places. Opposition responded to this further experimentation by stating that Lavoisier continued to draw the incorrect conclusions and that his experiment demonstrated the displacement of phlogiston from iron by the combination of water with the metal. Lavoisier developed a new apparatus which used a pneumatic trough, a set of balances, a thermometer, and a barometer, all calibrated carefully. Thirty savants were invited to witness the decomposition and synthesis of water using this apparatus, convincing many who attended of the correctness of Lavoisier's theories. This demonstration established water as a compound of oxygen and hydrogen with great certainty for those who viewed it. The dissemination of the experiment, however, proved subpar, as it lacked the details to properly display the amount of precision taken in the measurements. The paper ended with a hasty statement that the experiment was "more than sufficient to lay hold of the certainty of the proposition" of the composition of water and stated that the methods used in the experiment would unite chemistry with the other physical sciences and advance discoveries.

=== Elementary Treatise of Chemistry ===
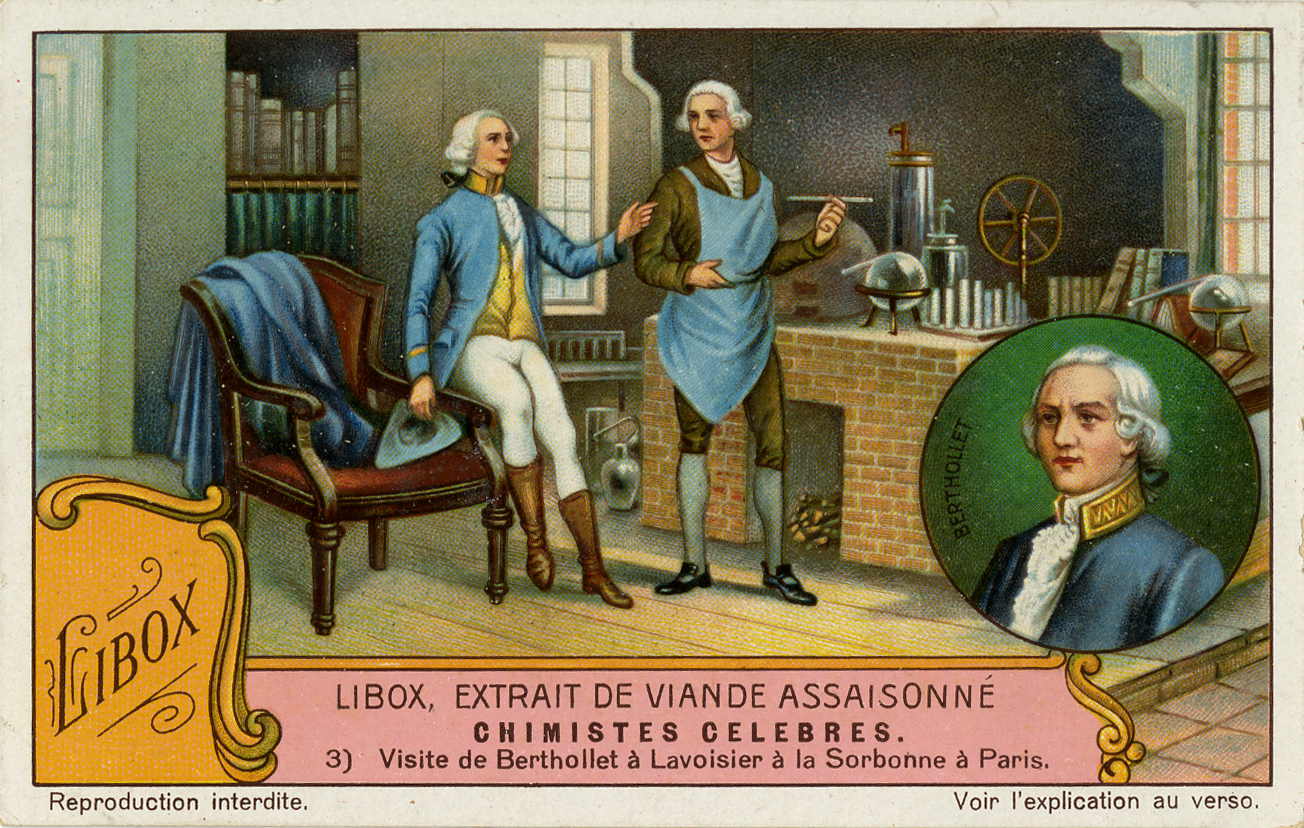
Lavoisier and Berthollet, Chimistes Celebres, Liebig's Extract of Meat Company Trading Card, 1929

Lavoisier employed the new nomenclature in his Traité élémentaire de chimie (Elementary Treatise on Chemistry), published in 1789. This work represents the synthesis of Lavoisier's contribution to chemistry and can be considered the first modern textbook on the subject. The core of the work was the oxygen theory, and the work became a most effective vehicle for the transmission of the new doctrines. It presented a unified view of new theories of chemistry, contained a clear statement of the law of conservation of mass, and denied the existence of phlogiston. This text clarified the concept of an element as a substance that could not be broken down by any known method of chemical analysis and presented Lavoisier's theory of the formation of chemical compounds from elements. It remains a classic in the history of science. While many leading chemists of the time refused to accept Lavoisier's new ideas, demand for Traité élémentaire as a textbook in Edinburgh was sufficient to merit translation into English within about a year of its French publication. In any event, the Traité élémentaire was sufficiently sound to convince the next generation.

=== Physiological work ===
Lavoisier (wearing goggles) operates his solar furnace to prevent contamination from combustion products.

The relationship between combustion and respiration had long been recognized from the essential role which air played in both processes. Lavoisier was almost obliged, therefore, to extend his new theory of combustion to include the area of respiration physiology. His first memoirs on this topic were read to the Academy of Sciences in 1777, but his most significant contribution to this field was made in the winter of 1782–1783 in association with Laplace. The result of this work was published in a memoir, "On Heat." Lavoisier and Laplace designed an ice calorimeter apparatus for measuring the amount of heat given off during combustion or respiration. The outer shell of the calorimeter was packed with snow, which melted to maintain a constant temperature of 0 °C around an inner shell filled with ice. By measuring the quantity of carbon dioxide and heat produced by confining a live guinea pig in this apparatus, and by comparing the amount of heat produced when sufficient carbon was burned in the ice calorimeter to produce the same amount of carbon dioxide as that which the guinea pig exhaled, they concluded that respiration was, in fact, a slow combustion process. Lavoisier stated, "la respiration est donc une combustion," that is, respiratory gas exchange is a combustion, like that of a candle burning.

This continuous slow combustion, which they supposed took place in the lungs, enabled the living animal to maintain its body temperature above that of its surroundings, thus accounting for the puzzling phenomenon of animal heat. Lavoisier continued these respiration experiments in 1789–1790 in cooperation with Armand Seguin. They designed an ambitious set of experiments to study the whole process of body metabolism and respiration using Seguin as a human guinea pig in the experiments. Their work was only partially completed and published because of the Revolution's disruption, but Lavoisier's pioneering work in this field inspired similar research on physiological processes for generations.

== Legacy ==
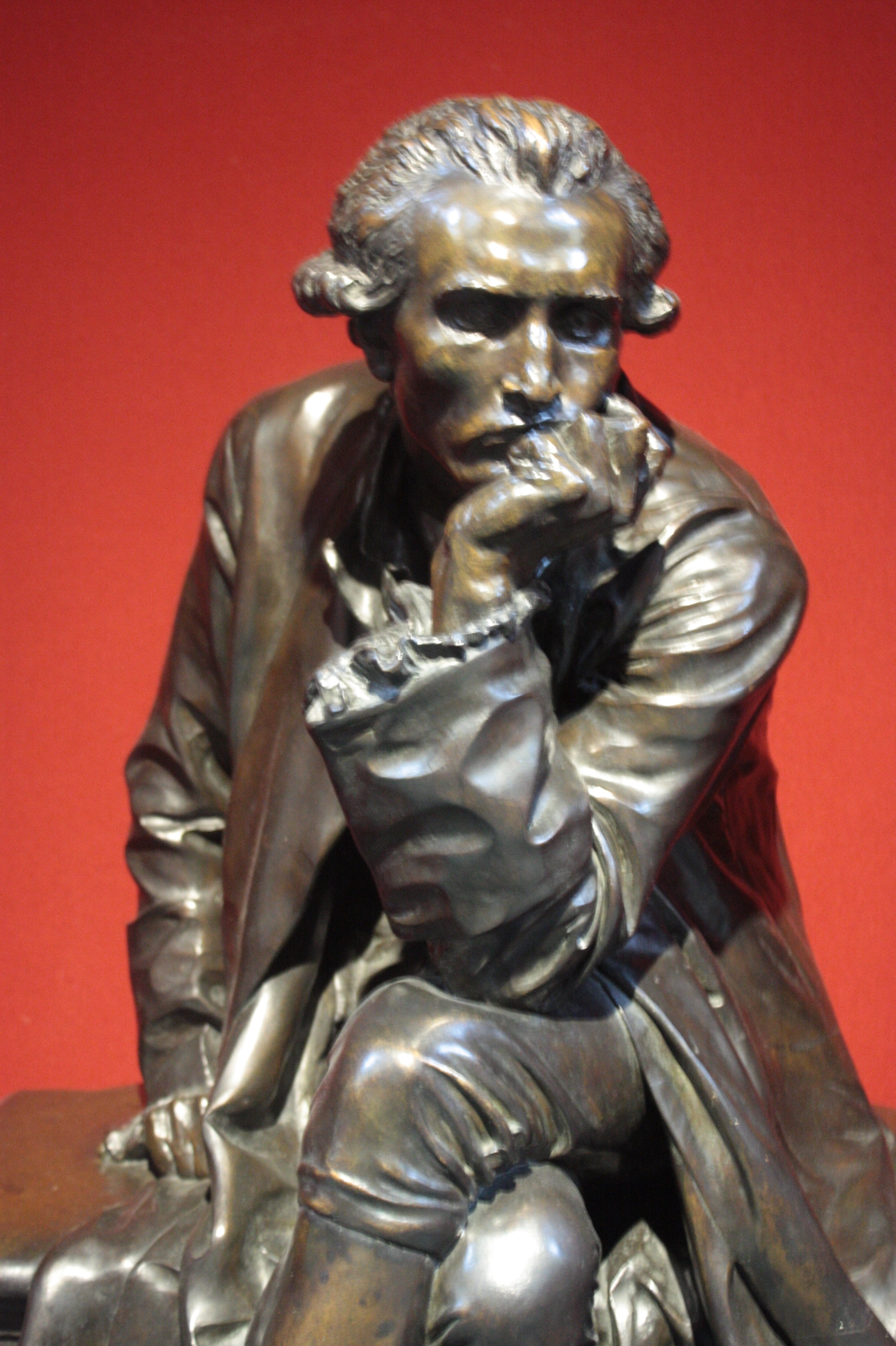
Antoine-Laurent Lavoisier by Jules Dalou 1866

Lavoisier's fundamental contributions to chemistry were a result of a conscious effort to fit all experiments into the framework of a single theory. He established the consistent use of the chemical balance, used oxygen to overthrow the phlogiston theory, and developed a new system of chemical nomenclature which held that oxygen was an essential constituent of all acids (which later turned out to be erroneous).

Lavoisier also did early research in physical chemistry and thermodynamics in joint experiments with Laplace. They used a calorimeter to estimate the heat evolved per unit of carbon dioxide produced, eventually finding the same ratio for a flame and animals, indicating that animals produced energy by a type of combustion reaction.

Lavoisier also contributed to early ideas on composition and chemical changes by stating the radical theory, believing that radicals, which function as a single group in a chemical process, combine with oxygen in reactions. He also introduced the possibility of allotropy in chemical elements when he discovered that diamond is a crystalline form of carbon.

He was also responsible for the construction of the gasometer, an expensive instrument he used at his demonstrations. While he used his gasometer exclusively for these, he also created smaller, cheaper, more practical gasometers that worked with a sufficient degree of precision that more chemists could recreate.

Overall, his contributions are considered the most important in advancing chemistry to the level reached in physics and mathematics during the 18th century.

Following his death, a collection comprising most of his scientific manuscripts and instruments was established by his relatives at the Château de la Canière in Puy-de-Dôme.

Mount Lavoisier in New Zealand's Paparoa Range was named after him in 1970 by the Department of Scientific and Industrial Research.

== In popular culture ==
In the Breaking Bad season 5 episode “Say My Name” (episode 7), Walter White tells Todd Alquist, “I don’t need you to be Antoine Lavoisier,” meaning that Todd does not need to be an expert to assist with cooking methamphetamine.

== Awards and honours ==
During his lifetime, Lavoisier was awarded a gold medal by the King of France for his work on urban street lighting (1766), and was appointed to the French Academy of Sciences (1768). He was elected as a member of the American Philosophical Society in 1775.

Lavoisier's work was recognized as an International Historic Chemical Landmark by the American Chemical Society, Académie des sciences de L'institut de France and the Société Chimique de France in 1999. Antoine Laurent Lavoisier's Louis 1788 publication entitled Méthode de Nomenclature Chimique, published with colleagues Louis-Bernard Guyton de Morveau, Claude Louis Berthollet, and Antoine François, comte de Fourcroy, was honored by a Citation for Chemical Breakthrough Award from the Division of History of Chemistry of the American Chemical Society, presented at the Académie des Sciences (Paris) in 2015.

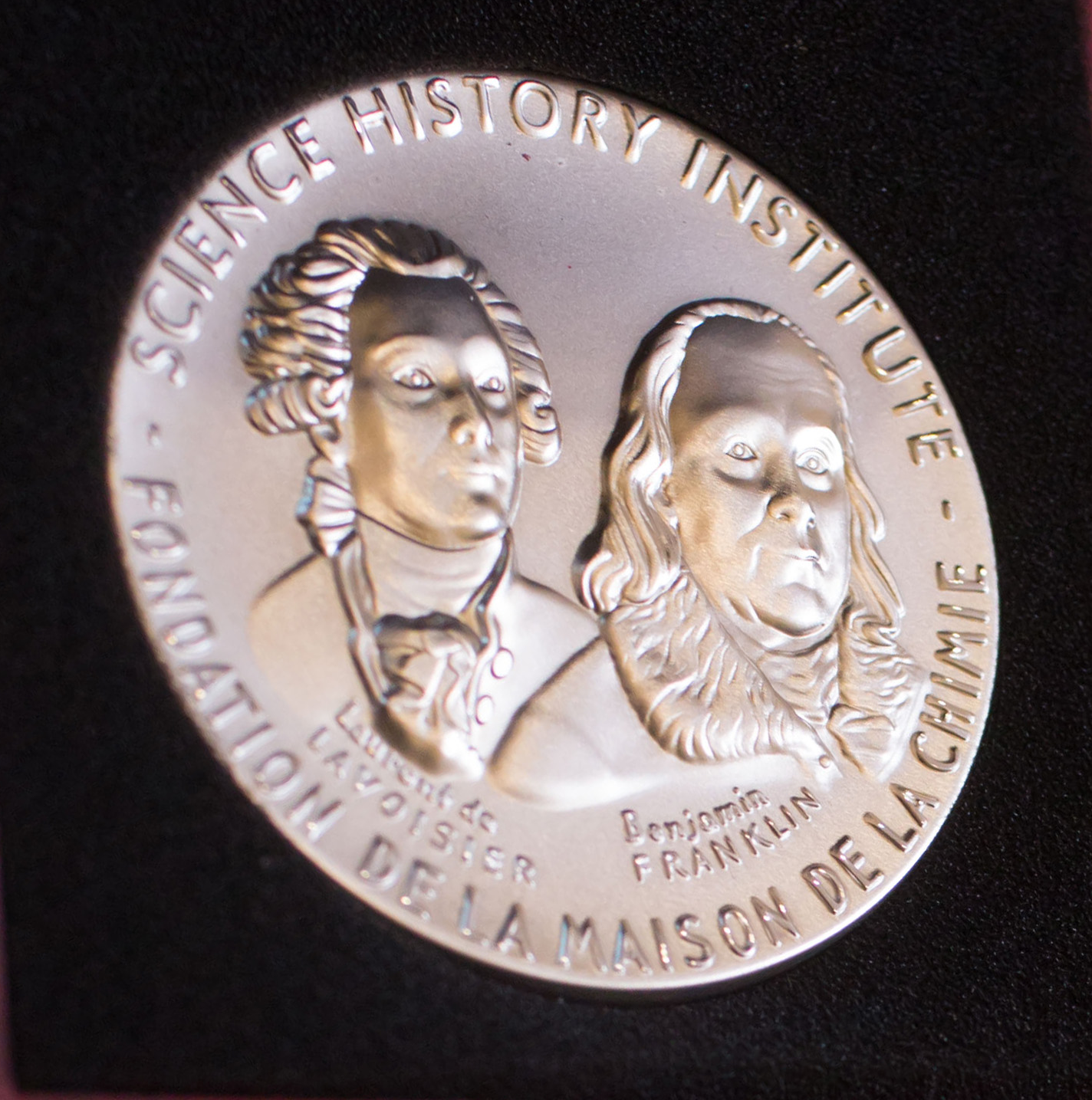
Medal commemorating Franklin and Lavoisier, 2018

A number of Lavoisier Medals have been named and given in Lavoisier's honour, by organizations including the Société chimique de France, the International Society for Biological Calorimetry, and the DuPont company He is also commemorated by the Franklin-Lavoisier Prize, marking the friendship of Antoine-Laurent Lavoisier and Benjamin Franklin. The prize, which includes a medal, is given jointly by the Fondation de la Maison de la Chimie in Paris, France and the Science History Institute in Philadelphia, PA, USA.

== Selected writings ==
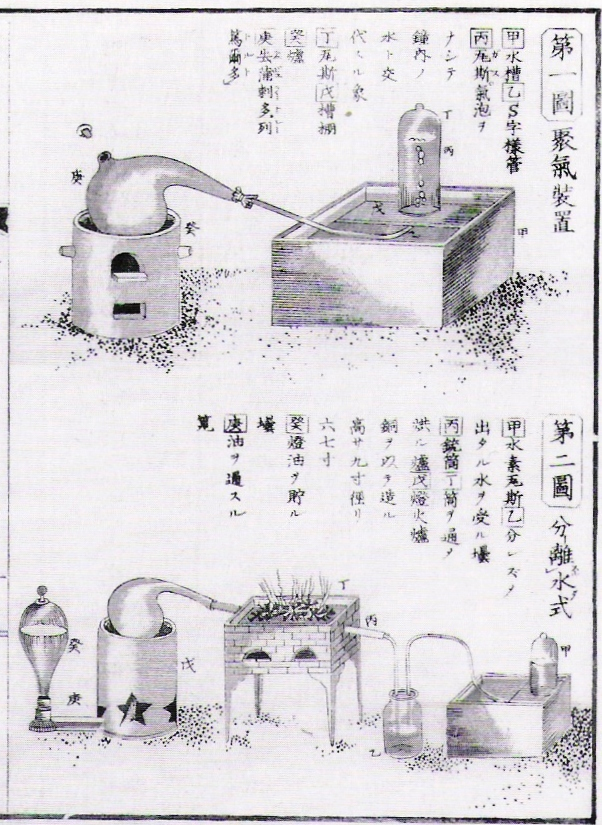
The work of Lavoisier was translated in Japan in the 1840s, through the process of Rangaku. Page from Udagawa Yōan's 1840 Seimi Kaisō

- Opuscules physiques et chimiques (Paris: Chez Durand, Didot, Esprit, 1774). (Second edition, 1801)
- L'art de fabriquer le salin et la potasse, publié par ordre du Roi, par les régisseurs-généraux des Poudres & Salpêtres (Paris, 1779).
- Instruction sur les moyens de suppléer à la disette des fourrages, et d'augmenter la subsistence des bestiaux, Supplément à l'instruction sur les moyens de pourvoir à la disette des fourrages, publiée par ordre du Roi le 31 mai 1785 (Instruction on the means of compensating for the food shortage with fodder, and of increasing the subsistence of cattle, Supplement to the instruction on the means of providing for the food shortage with fodder, published by order of King on 31 May 1785).
- (with Guyton de Morveau, Claude-Louis Berthollet, Antoine Fourcroy) Méthode de nomenclature chimique (Paris: Chez Cuchet, 1787)
- (with Fourcroy, Morveau, Cadet, Baumé, d'Arcet, and Sage) Nomenclature chimique, ou synonymie ancienne et moderne, pour servir à l'intelligence des auteurs. (Paris: Chez Cuchet, 1789)
- Traité élémentaire de chimie, présenté dans un ordre nouveau et d'après les découvertes modernes (Paris: Chez Cuchet, 1789; Bruxelles: Cultures et Civilisations, 1965) (lit. Elementary Treatise on Chemistry, presented in a new order and alongside modern discoveries) also here
- (with Pierre-Simon Laplace) "Mémoire sur la chaleur," Mémoires de l'Académie des sciences (1780), pp. 355–408.
- Mémoire contenant les expériences faites sur la chaleur, pendant l'hiver de 1783 à 1784, par P.S. de Laplace & A. K. Lavoisier (1792)
- Mémoires de Physique et de Chimie, de la Société d'Arcueil (1805: posthumous)

=== In translation ===
- Essays Physical and Chemical (London: for Joseph Johnson, 1776; London: Frank Cass and Company Ltd., 1970) translation by Thomas Henry of Opuscules physiques et chimiques
- The Art of Manufacturing Alkaline Salts and Potashes, Published by Order of His Most Christian Majesty, and approved by the Royal Academy of Sciences (1784) trans. by Charles Williamos of L'art de fabriquer le salin et la potasse
- (with Pierre-Simon Laplace) Memoir on Heat: Read to the Royal Academy of Sciences, 28 June 1783, by Messrs. Lavoisier & De La Place of the same Academy. (New York: Neale Watson Academic Publications, 1982) trans. by Henry Guerlac of Mémoire sur la chaleur
- Essays, on the Effects Produced by Various Processes On Atmospheric Air; With A Particular View To An Investigation Of The Constitution Of Acids, trans. Thomas Henry (London: Warrington, 1783) collects these essays:
1. "Experiments on the Respiration of Animals, and on the Changes effected on the Air in passing through their Lungs." (Read to the Académie des Sciences, 3 May 1777)
2. "On the Combustion of Candles in Atmospheric Air and in Dephlogistated Air." (Communicated to the Académie des Sciences, 1777)
3. "On the Combustion of Kunckel's Phosphorus."
4. "On the Existence of Air in the Nitrous Acid, and on the Means of decomposing and recomposing that Acid."
5. "On the Solution of Mercury in Vitriolic Acid."
6. "Experiments on the Combustion of Alum with Phlogistic Substances, and on the Changes effected on Air in which the Pyrophorus was burned."
7. "On the Vitriolisation of Martial Pyrites."
8. "General Considerations on the Nature of Acids, and on the Principles of which they are composed."
9. "On the Combination of the Matter of Fire with Evaporable Fluids; and on the Formation of Elastic Aëriform Fluids."
- "Reflections on Phlogiston", translation by Nicholas W. Best of "Réflexions sur le phlogistique, pour servir de suite à la théorie de la combustion et de la calcination" (read to the Académie Royale des Sciences over two nights, 28 June and 13 July 1783). Published in two parts:
1. Best, Nicholas W. (2015). "Lavoisier's "Reflections on phlogiston" I: Against phlogiston theory". Foundations of Chemistry. 17 (2): 361–378. doi:10.1007/s10698-015-9220-5. S2CID 170422925.
2. Best, Nicholas W. (2016). "Lavoisier's "Reflections on phlogiston" II: On the nature of heat". Foundations of Chemistry. 18 (1): 3–13. doi:10.1007/s10698-015-9236-x. S2CID 94677080.
- Method of chymical nomenclature: proposed by Messrs. De Moreau, Lavoisier, Bertholet, and De Fourcroy (1788) Dictionary
- Elements of Chemistry, in a New Systematic Order, Containing All the Modern Discoveries (Edinburgh: William Creech, 1790; New York: Dover, 1965) translation by Robert Kerr of Traité élémentaire de chimie. ISBN 978-0-486-64624-4 (Dover).
  - 1799 edition
  - 1802 edition: volume 1, volume 2
  - Some illustrations from 1793 edition
  - Some more illustrations from the Science History Institute
  - More illustrations (from Collected Works) from the Science History Institute
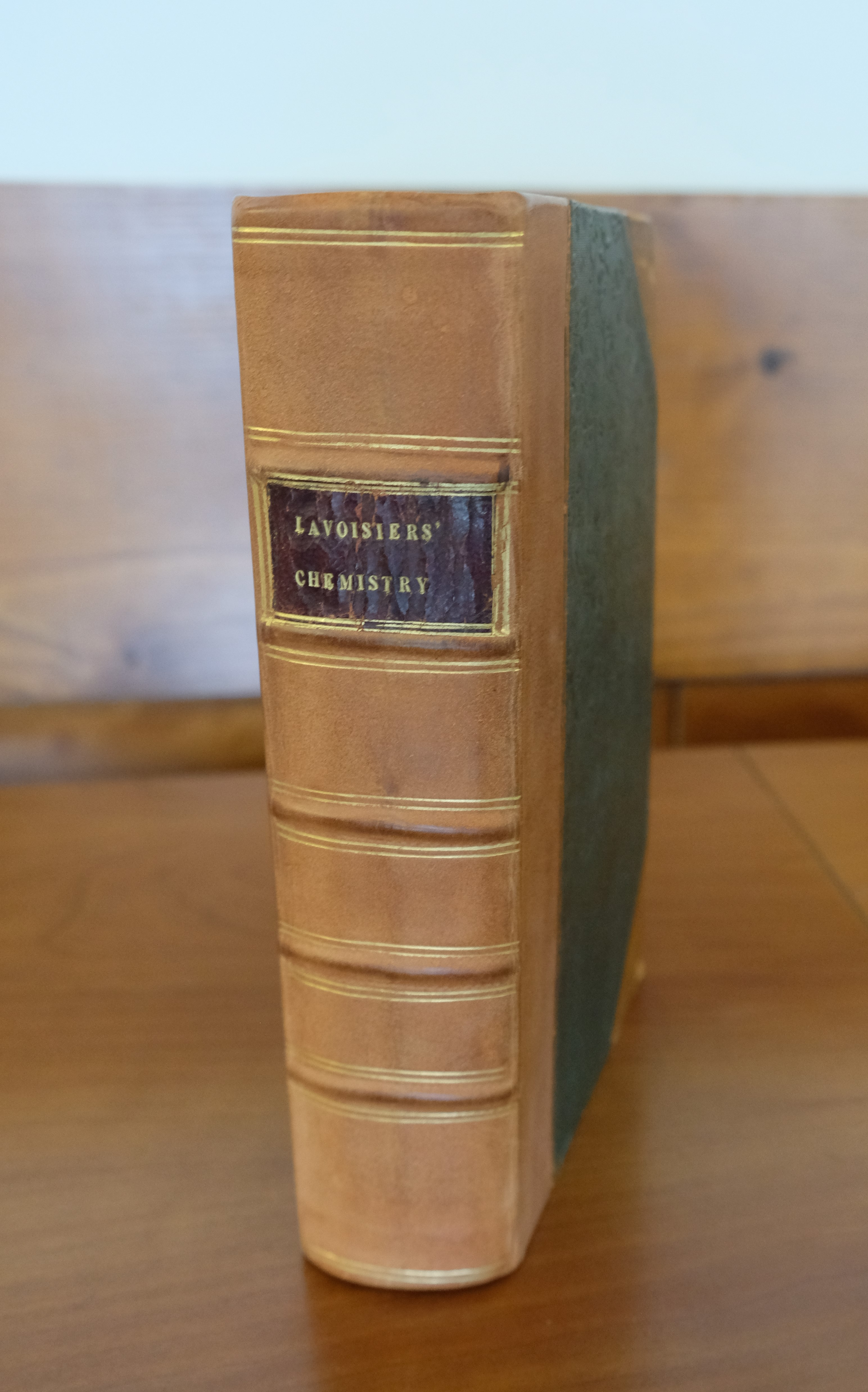
1790 copy of "Elements of Chemistry in a Systematic Order Containing All the Modern Discoveries"

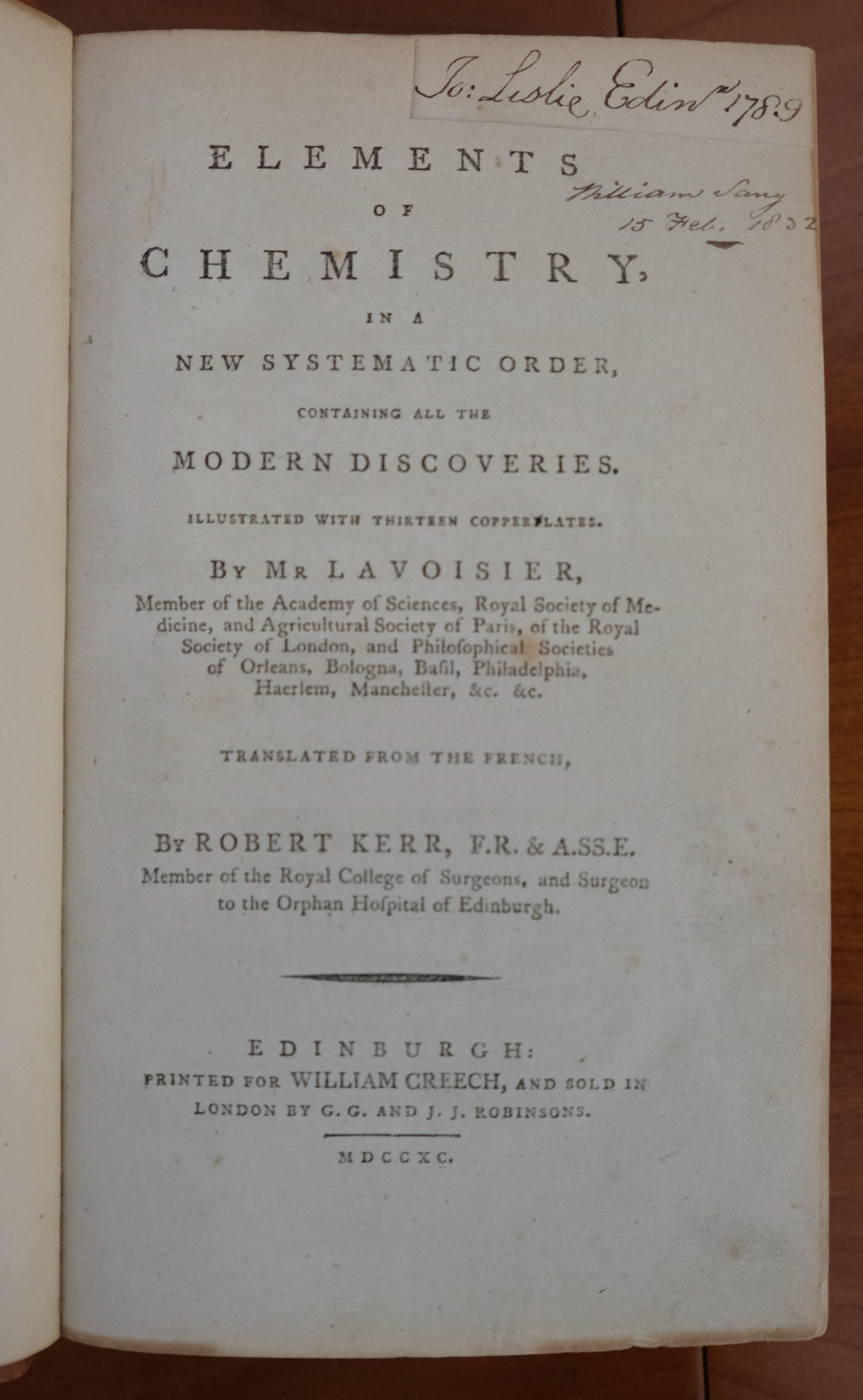
Title page to "Elements of Chemistry in a Systematic Order Containing All the Modern Discoveries" (1790)

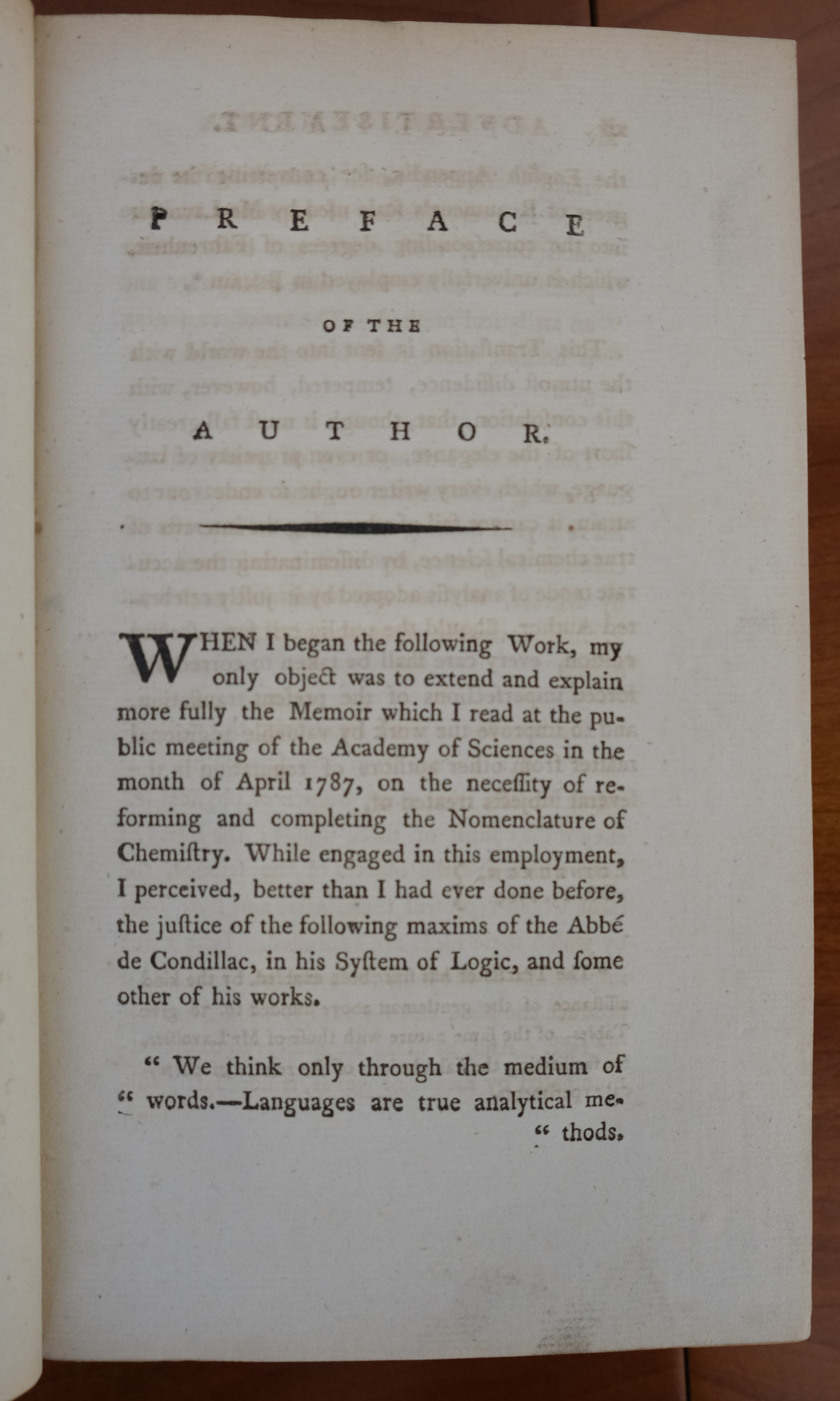
Preface to "Elements of Chemistry in a Systematic Order Containing All the Modern Discoveries" (1790)

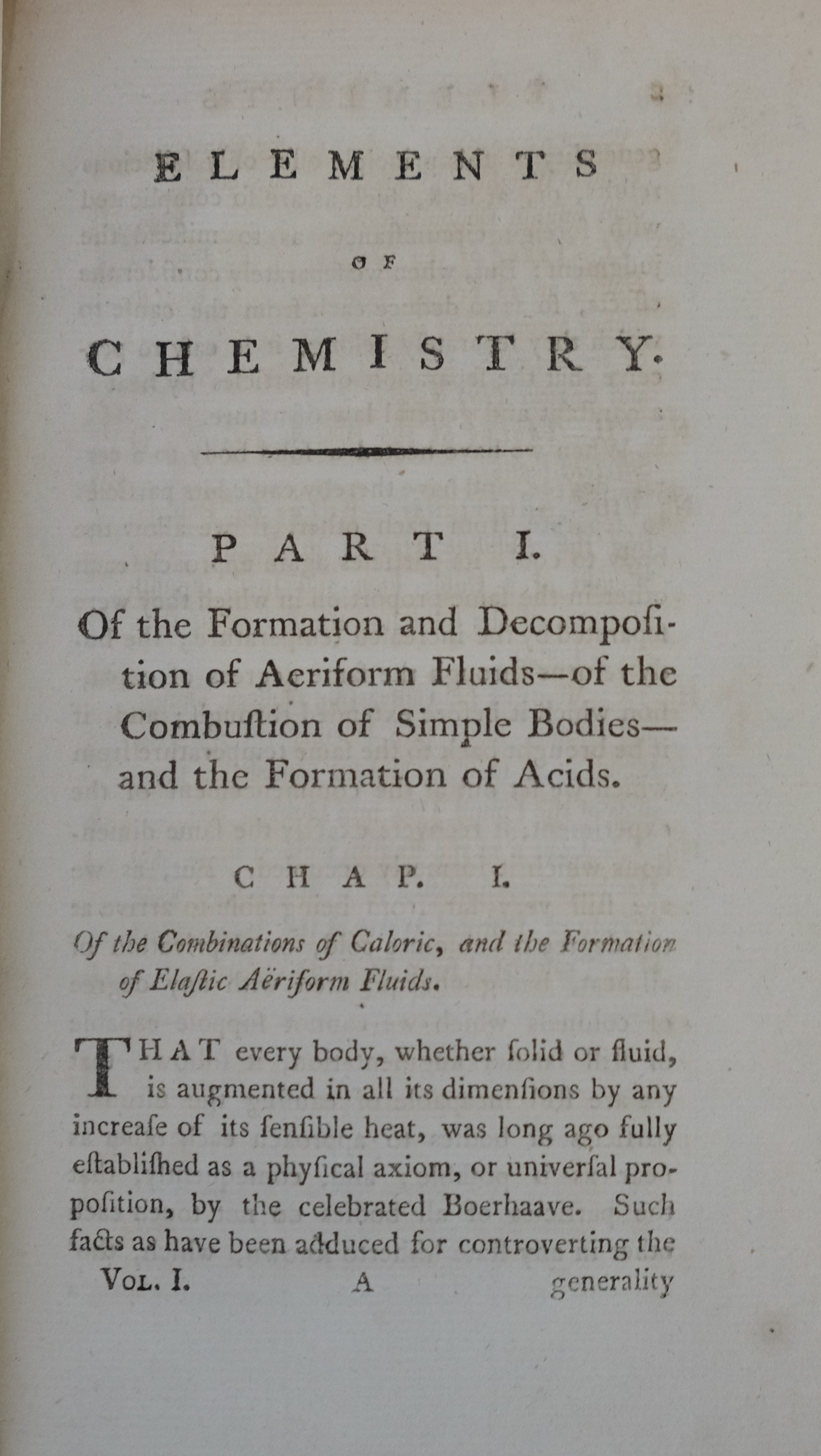
First page of "Elements of Chemistry in a Systematic Order Containing All the Modern Discoveries" (1790)

== See also ==
- Royal Commission on Animal Magnetism – 1784 French scientific bodies' investigations involving systematic controlled trials
