= Portrait of Antoine and Marie-Anne Lavoisier =

Painting by Jacques-Louis David

Portrait of Antoine-Laurent Lavoisier and Marie-Anne Paulze Lavoisier
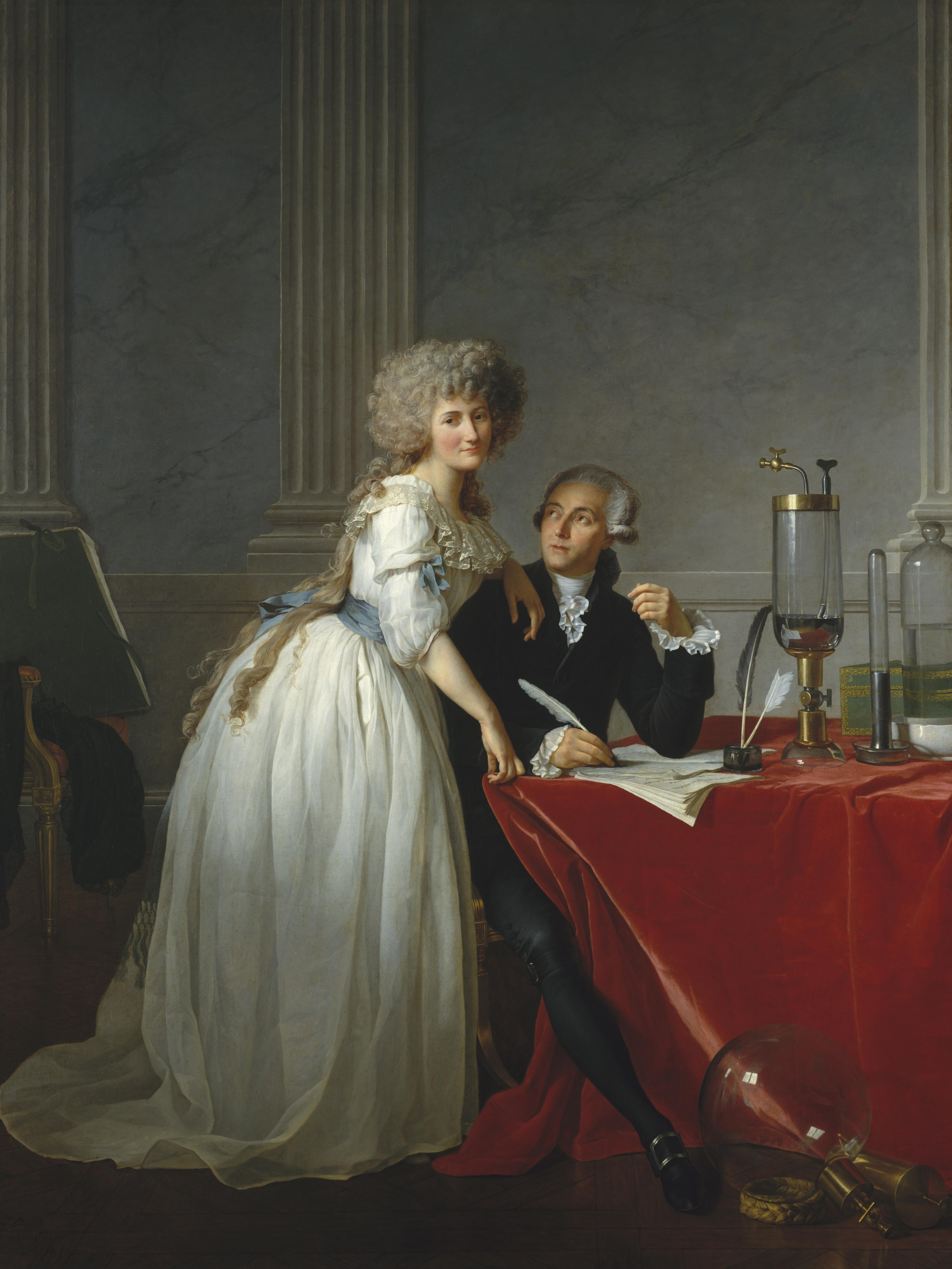
- Artist: Jacques-Louis David
- Year: 1788
- Medium: Oil on canvas
- Dimensions: 259.7 cm × 194.6 cm (102.2 in × 76.6 in)
- Location: Metropolitan Museum of Art, New York

The Portrait of Antoine and Marie-Anne Lavoisier (French: Portrait d'Antoine et Marie-Anne Lavoisier) is a double portrait of the French chemist Antoine Lavoisier and his wife and collaborator Marie-Anne Pierrette Paulze, commissioned from the French painter Jacques-Louis David in 1788 by Marie-Anne (who had been taught drawing by David).

== Description ==
The work is painted in oils on a canvas of 259.7 × 194.6 cm.

It shows the couple in Lavoisier's office, with a wood-paneled floor and walls of false marble with three classical pilasters. In the center, the couple face the viewer with both their heads in three-quarters profile. Marie-Anne is shown standing, looking at the viewer. Her costume is that in fashion at the end of the 18th century – powdered hair, a white dress with a lace-edged ruffled neckline, and a blue fabric sash. She rests on her husband's shoulder, with her right hand leaning on the table.

Antoine Lavoisier is seated, wearing a black vest, culottes (knee breeches), long stockings, and buckled shoes, a white shirt with a lace jabot and powdered hair. His face turns towards his wife and he rests his left arm on the table, while writing with his right hand using a quill pen. The table is covered with scarlet velvet, many papers, a casket, an inkwell with two more quill pens, a barometer, a gasometer, a water still and a glass bell jar. A large round-bottom flask and a tap are on the floor to the right, by the table. To the table's extreme left is a chair with a large document-case and black cloth on it. The document-case, presumed to correspond to Madame's interest in the art of drawing, emphasizes a left-to-right symmetry in the portrait between M. Lavoisier and objects of science visibly displayed on the right, and Madame with her document case of artistic drawings prominently displayed on the left side of the portrait. Significant also is the depiction by David of the wife in a posture physically above the husband, somewhat atypical by late 18th century conventional standards of depicting a married couple in portraiture.

The painting is signed at the lower left: L DAVID, PARISIIS ANNO, 1788.

== History ==
David was paid 7,000 livres for the portrait on 16 December 1788. This was a huge sum, even more than the 6,000 he received from Louis XVI for The Lictors Bring to Brutus the Bodies of His Sons. Full length portraits were uncommon for all but royalty at the time, making the portrait a testament to the Lavoisiers' status and wealth. It was not permitted to be put on public display at the Paris Salon for fear that an image of Lavoisier – a figure connected to the royal court and the Ancien Régime – might provoke anti-aristocratic aggression from viewers.

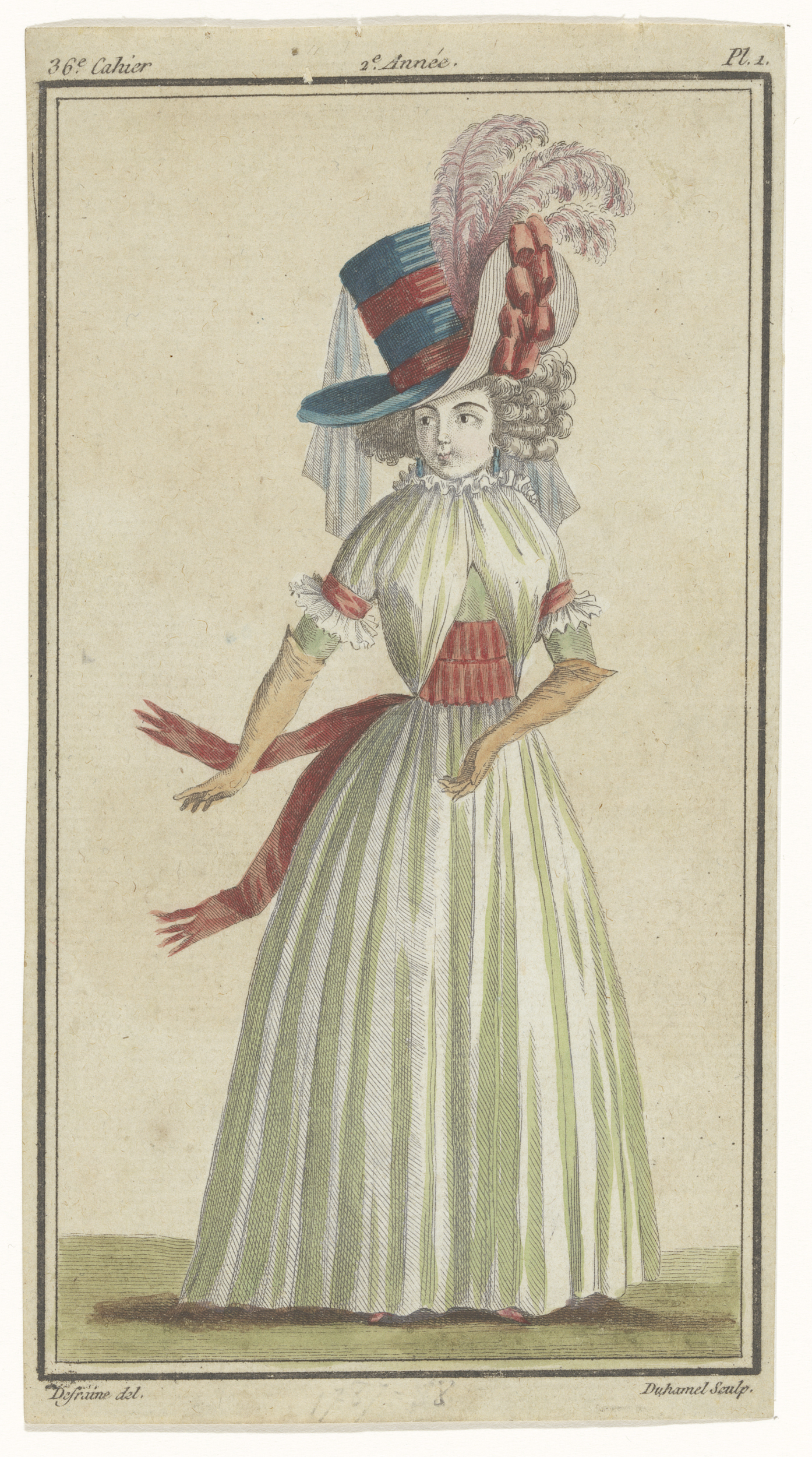
A woman wearing a Chapeau à la Tarare

Recent research has shown that the painting was modified significantly during its development. Using infrared reflectography and macro x-ray fluorescence mapping, investigators from the Metropolitan Museum of Art discovered several important features which David altered in the final portrait. The depiction of Antoine-Laurent Lavoisier and Marie-Anne Lavoisier was originally as "wealthy tax collectors and fashionable luxury consumers." The chemical instruments were added later. The couple's clothes were also altered. Marie-Anne initially was depicted wearing an elegant hat called a chapeau à la Tarare, named after the successful Beaumarchais and Salieri's opera, which were exceedingly popular among wealthy Parisian women in 1787. Additionally, Antoine-Laurent was dressed in a longer brown coat, and the red cloth over the table originally covered a gilded table in the neoclassical style. Tally books on a shelf behind the couple were repainted into a plain wall, suggesting that David's initial portrait depicted a wealthy aristocratic couple which he later altered into a depiction of scientific partners.

Despite Lavoisier's efforts to craft a more modest image for himself, he was arrested in 1793 for his former role in the ferme générale. He was executed by guillotine in July 1794. Lavoisier would later be exonerated by the French government, and his belongings were returned to his widow.

== Ownership ==
In 1836, the painting was left by Marie-Anne to her great-niece, and it remained in the collection of the Comtesse de Chazelles and her descendants until 1924, when it was bought by John D. Rockefeller. Rockefeller gave it to the Rockefeller Institute for Medical Research in 1927, and it was acquired from this institution by the Metropolitan Museum in 1977.

== Legacy ==
Since the painting was not publicly displayed until 1889, it contributed no influence to other artists of David's era. Still, it is considered a marvelous example of neoclassical portraiture, outstanding amongst the artistic tradition of its time and place. The work is especially notable for its experimental approach to posture, David's impressive work in depicting chemical instruments, and its responsiveness to the impending outset of the French Revolution.

== See also ==
- List of paintings by Jacques-Louis David
