= Marie-Anne Paulze Lavoisier =

French chemist and noblewoman (1758–1836)

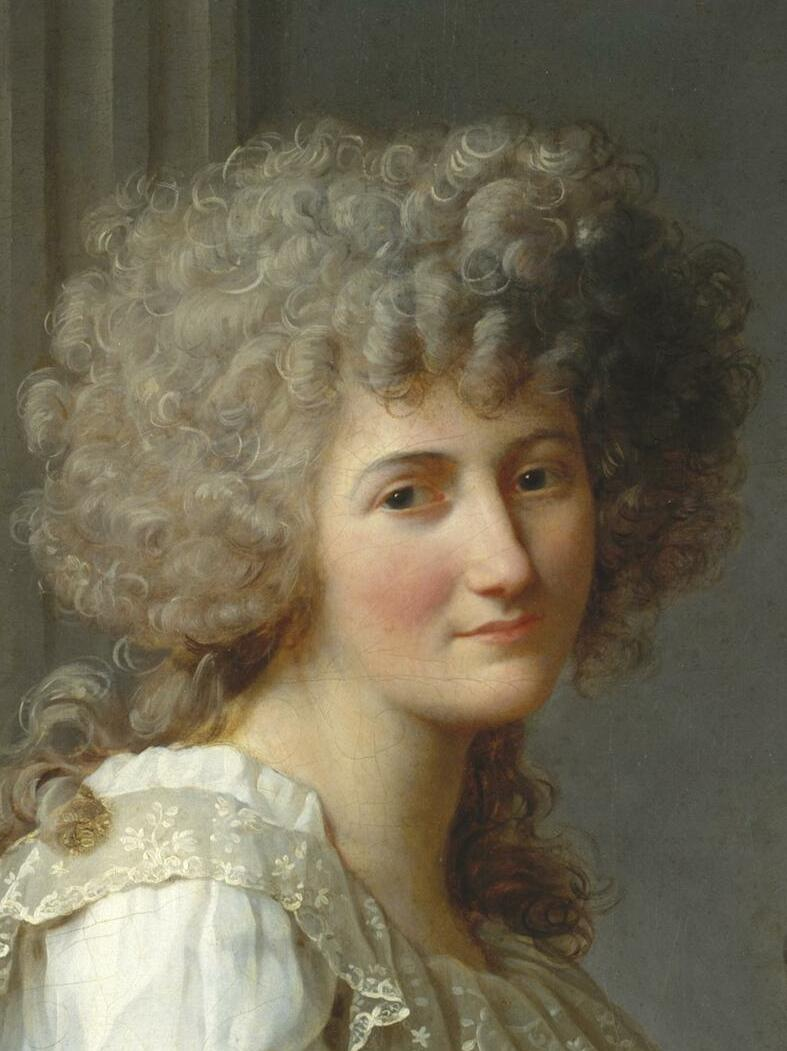
- Detail from Portrait of Antoine and Marie-Anne Lavoisier by Jacques-Louis David, 1788
- Born: Marie-Anne Pierrette Paulze; 20 January 1758; Montbrison, France
- Died: 10 February 1836 (aged 78); Paris, France
- Resting place: Père Lachaise Cemetery, Paris, France
- Spouses: Antoine Lavoisier (m. 1771; died 1794) Benjamin Thompson, Count of Rumford (m. 1804; sep. 1807)
- Scientific career
- Fields: Chemistry

Signature
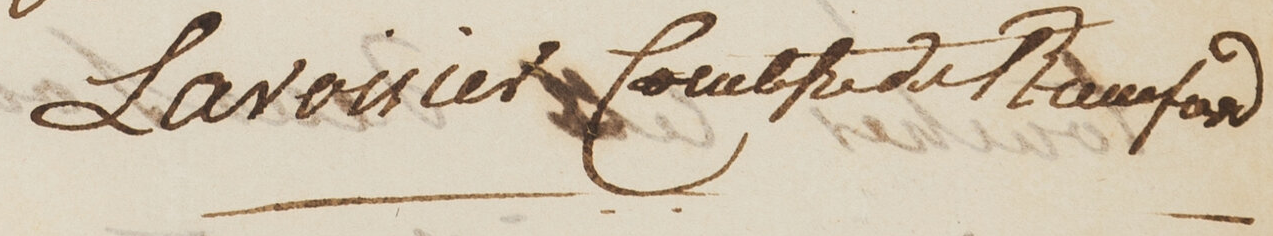

Marie-Anne Pierrette Paulze Lavoisier, later Countess of Rumford, (French: [maʁi an pɔlz lavwazje]; 20 January 1758 – 10 February 1836) was a French chemist and noblewoman. Madame Lavoisier's first husband was the chemist and nobleman Antoine Lavoisier. She acted as his laboratory companion, using her linguistic skills to write up his work and bring it to an international audience. She also played a pivotal role in the translation of several scientific works and was instrumental to the standardization of the scientific method.

== Biography ==
Her father, Jacques Paulze, worked primarily as a parliamentary lawyer and financier. Most of his income came from running the Ferme Générale (the General Farm) which was a private consortium of financiers who paid the French monarchy for the privilege of collecting certain taxes. Her mother, Claudine Thoynet Paulze, died in 1761, leaving behind Marie-Anne, then aged 3, and two sons. After her mother's death Paulze was placed in a convent where she received her formal education. She was for a time a pupil of the artist Jacques-Louis David.

At the age of thirteen, Paulze received a marriage proposal from the 50-year-old Count d'Amerval. Jacques Paulze tried to object to the union, but received threats about losing his job with the Ferme Générale. To indirectly thwart the marriage, Jacques Paulze made an offer to one of his colleagues to ask for his daughter's hand instead. This colleague was Antoine Lavoisier, a French nobleman and scientist. Lavoisier accepted the proposition, and he and Marie-Anne were married on 16 December 1771. Lavoisier was about 28, while Marie-Anne was about 13.

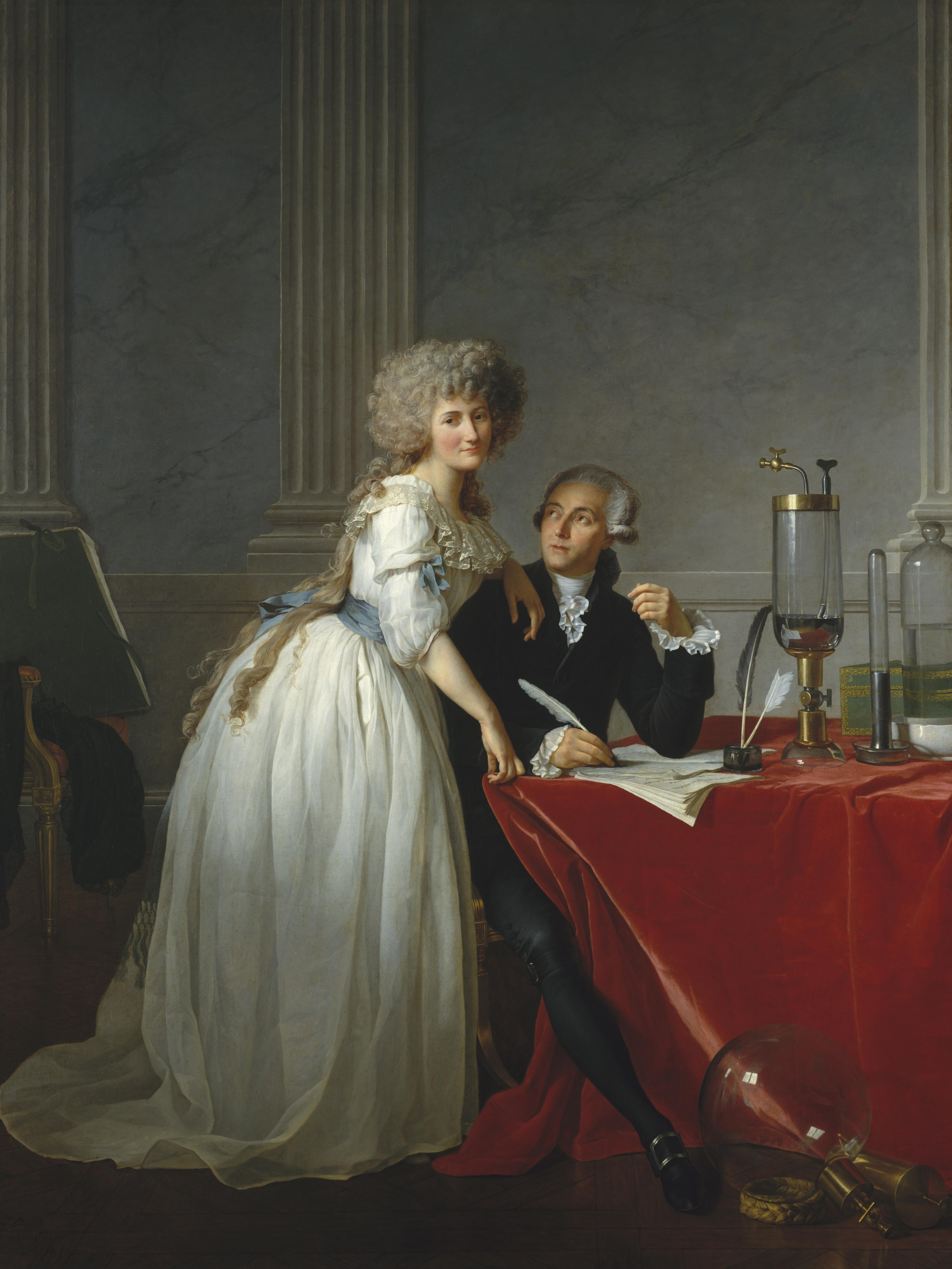
Portrait of M. and Mme Lavoisier by Jacques-Louis David, 1788 (Metropolitan Museum of Art, Manhattan, New York City)

Lavoisier continued to work for the Ferme-Générale but in 1775 was appointed gunpowder administrator, leading the couple to settle down at the Arsenal in Paris. Here, Lavoisier's interest in chemistry blossomed after having previously trained at the chemical laboratory of Guillaume François Rouelle, and, with the financial security provided by both his and Paulze's family, as well as his various titles and other business ventures, he was able to construct a state-of-the-art chemistry laboratory. Paulze soon became interested in his scientific research and began to participate in her husband's laboratory work actively.

As her interest developed, she received formal training in the field from Jean Baptiste Michel Bucquet and Philippe Gingembre, both of whom were Lavoisier's colleagues at the time. The Lavoisiers spent most of their time together in the laboratory, working as a team conducting research on many fronts. She also assisted him by translating documents about chemistry from English to French. In fact, the majority of the research effort put forth in the laboratory was actually a joint effort between Paulze and her husband, with Paulze mainly playing the role of laboratory assistant.

=== French Revolution ===
In 1793 Lavoisier, due to his prominent position in the Ferme-Générale, was branded a traitor during the Reign of Terror by French revolutionaries. Paulze's father, another prominent Ferme-Générale member, was arrested on similar grounds. On 28 November 1793 Lavoisier surrendered to revolutionaries and was imprisoned at Port Libre. Throughout his imprisonment, Paulze visited Lavoisier regularly and fought for his release. She presented his case before André Dupin de Beaumont, who was Lavoisier's accuser and a former member of the Ferme-Générale. She told of her husband's accomplishments as a scientist and his importance to the nation of France. Despite her efforts, Lavoisier was tried, convicted of treason, and executed on 8 May 1794 in Paris, at the age of 50. Jacques Paulze was also executed on the same day.

After her husband's death, Paulze became bitter. She was bankrupt following the new government's confiscation of her money and property (which were eventually returned). In addition, the new government seized all of Lavoisier's notebooks and laboratory equipment. Despite these obstacles, Marie-Anne organized the publication of Lavoisier's final memoirs, Mémoires de Chimie, a compilation of his papers and those of his colleagues demonstrating the principles of the new chemistry. The first volume contained work on heat and the formation of liquids, while the second dealt with the ideas of combustion, air, calcination of metals, the action of acids, and the composition of water. In the original copy, Paulze wrote the preface and attacked revolutionaries and Lavoisier's contemporaries, whom she believed to be responsible for his death. This preface, however, was not included in the final publication. Nevertheless, her efforts secured her husband's legacy in the field of chemistry.

=== Later life ===
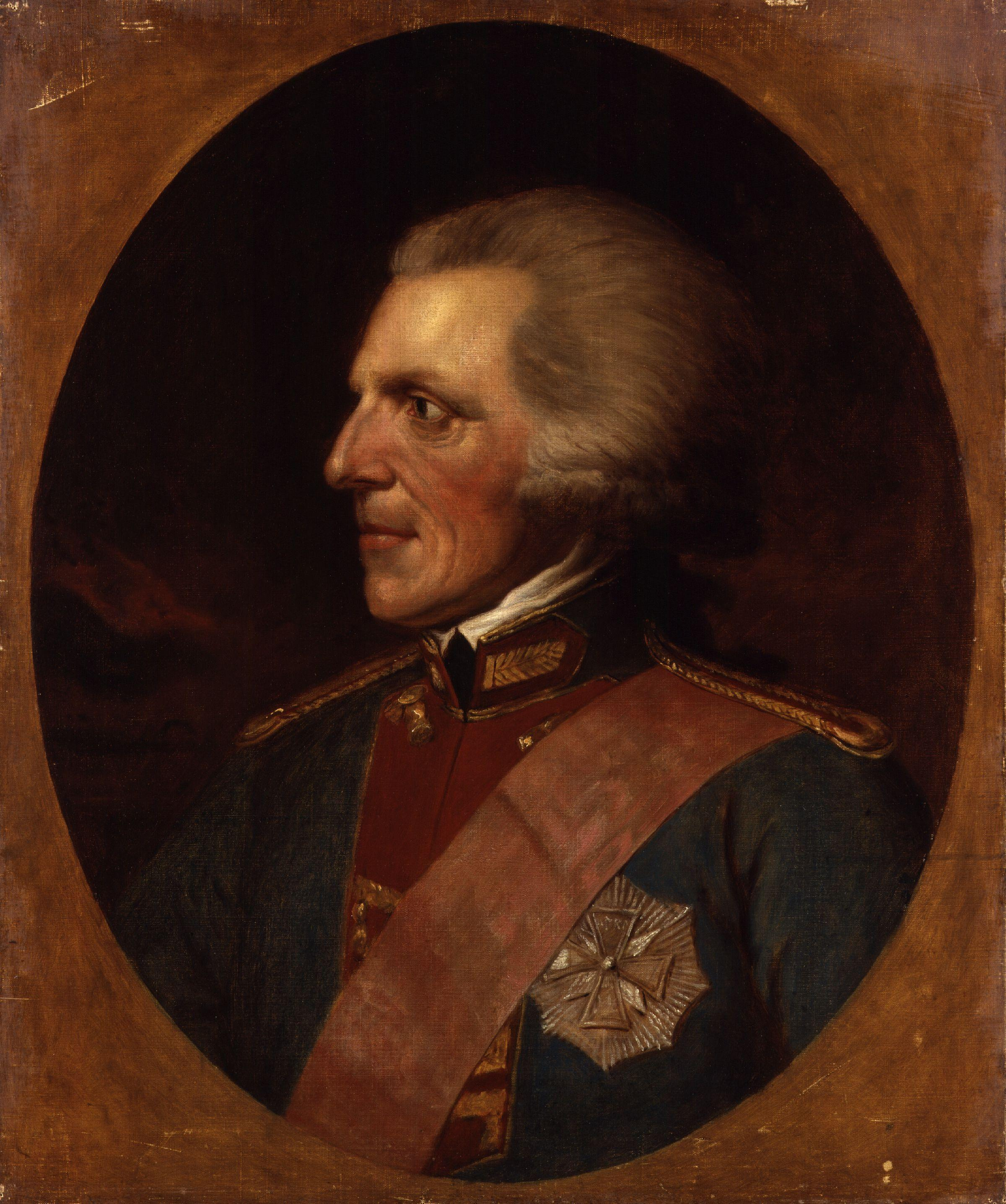
Sir Benjamin Thompson FRS, Count of Rumford, by Kellerhoven

Paulze married Benjamin Thompson in 1804, following a four-year courtship and engagement; she was his second wife. Thompson was born in Colonial Massachusetts in 1753 and was a veteran, as a loyalist, of the American Revolutionary War. In his youth, before becoming a merchant and soldier, he had attended lectures by Winthrop at Harvard. In 1785, he travelled to Bavaria to become aide-de-camp to the Prince-elector, Charles Theodore. There he reorganised the army and established workhouses for the poor. He also created the Englischer Garten in Munich in 1789, all the while continuing his scientific experiments. In 1791 he was elevated to Count of the Holy Roman Empire, taking the title of Reichsgraf von Rumford, after the town of Rumford in New Hampshire, where he was first married. By the time he had met the widowed Anne-Marie Lavoisier, he had become one of the most well-known physicists at the time. However, the marriage between the two was difficult and short-lived; they separated after three years. Paulze insisted throughout her life that she retain her first husband's last name, demonstrating her undying devotion to him. Rumford had moved to Paris where he continued his work until his death in 1814. He was buried at Auteuil, Paris.

Marie died very suddenly in her home in Paris on 10 February 1836, at the age of 78. She is buried in the cemetery of Pere-Lachaise in Paris.

== Contributions to chemistry ==
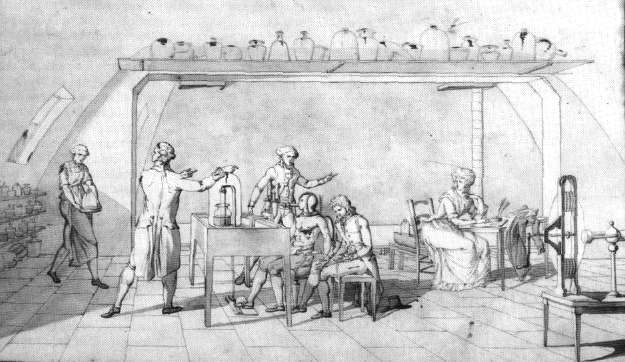
Madame Lavoisier while assisting her husband on his scientific research of human respiration; she is visible at the table on the far right. Etching by Mme Paulze Lavoisier.

Paulze assisted Lavoisier in the lab during the day, making entries in lab notebooks and sketching diagrams of his experimental designs. The training she had received from the painter Jacques-Louis David allowed her to accurately and precisely draw experimental apparatuses, which ultimately helped many of Lavoisier's contemporaries understand his methods and results. She served as editor of his reports and worked with him to develop the metric system of measurement. Together, the Lavoisiers rebuilt the field of chemistry, which had its roots in alchemy and at the time was a convoluted science dominated by George Stahl’s theory of phlogiston.

In the eighteenth century, the idea of phlogiston (a fire-like element which is gained or released during a material's combustion) was used to describe the apparent property changes that substances exhibited when burned. Paulze, being a master in English, Latin, and French, was able to translate various works about phlogiston into French for her husband to read. Perhaps her most important translation was that of Richard Kirwan's 'Essay on Phlogiston and the Constitution of Acids', which she both translated and critiqued, adding footnotes as she went along and pointing out errors in the chemistry throughout the paper. Despite her contributions, she was not attributed as a translator in the original work, but in later editions. She also translated works by Joseph Priestley, Henry Cavendish, and others for Lavoisier's personal use. This was an invaluable service to Lavoisier, who relied on Paulze's translation of foreign works to keep abreast of current developments in chemistry. In the case of phlogiston, it was Paulze's translation that convinced him the idea was incorrect, ultimately leading to his studies of combustion and his discovery of oxygen gas.

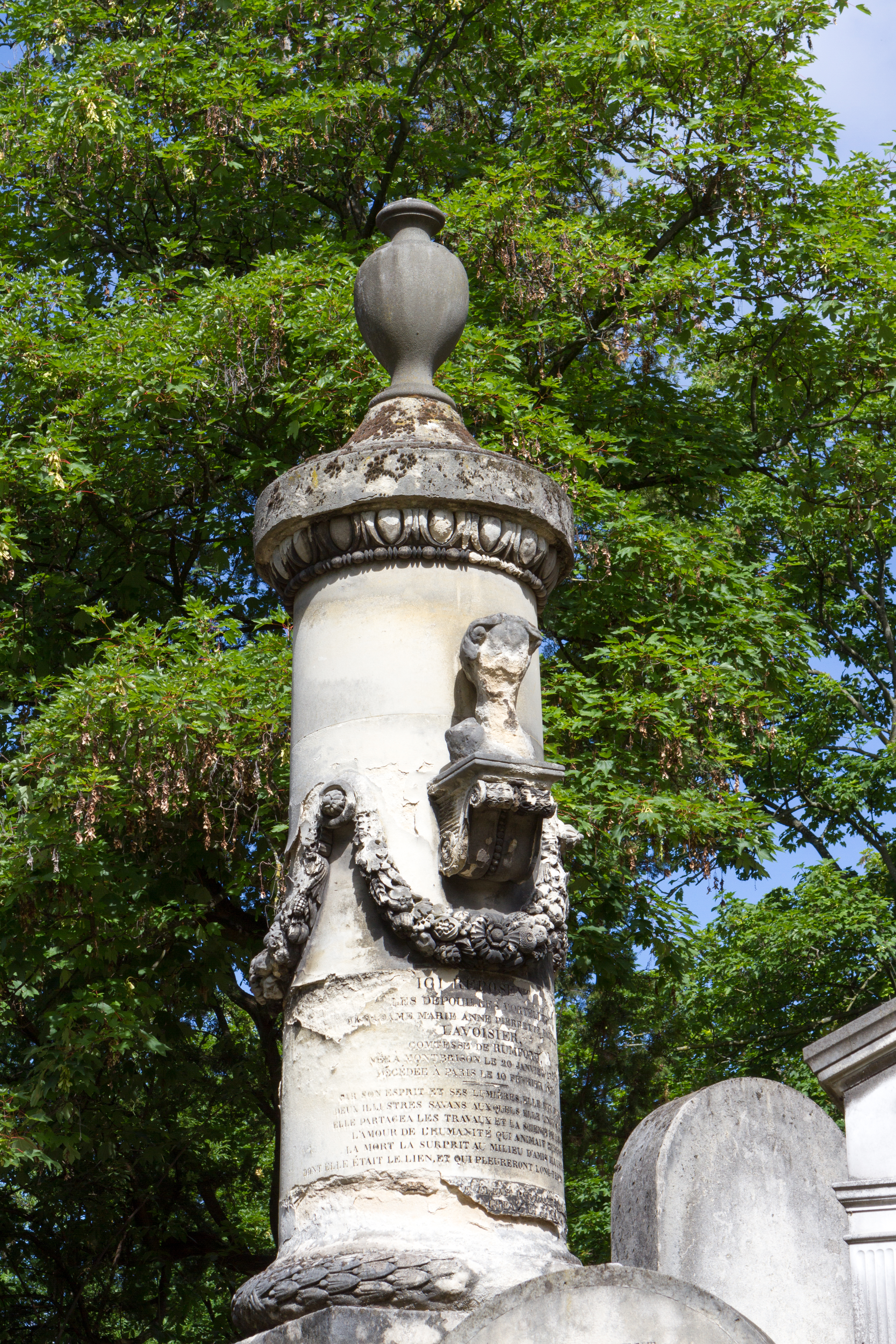
Grave of Marie-Anne Paulze Lavoisier at Père Lachaise Cemetery, Paris

Paulze was also instrumental in the 1789 publication of Lavoisier's groundbreaking Elementary Treatise on Chemistry, which presented a unified view of chemistry as a field. This work proved pivotal in the progression of chemistry, as it presented the idea of conservation of mass as well as a list of elements and a new system for chemical nomenclature. Paulze contributed thirteen drawings that showed all the laboratory instrumentation and equipment used by the Lavoisiers in their experiments. She also kept strict records of the procedures followed, lending validity to the findings Lavoisier published.

Before her death, Paulze was able to recover nearly all of Lavoisier's notebooks and chemical apparatuses, most of which survive in a collection at Cornell University, the largest of its kind outside of Europe. The year she died, a book was published showing that Marie-Anne had a rich theological library with books which included versions of The Bible, St. Augustine's Confessions, Jacques Saurin's Discours sur la Bible, Pierre Nicole's Essais de Morale, Blaise Pascal's Lettres provinciales, Louis Bourdaloue's Sermons, Thomas à Kempis's De Imitatione Christi, etc.

== Artistic training and contributions ==
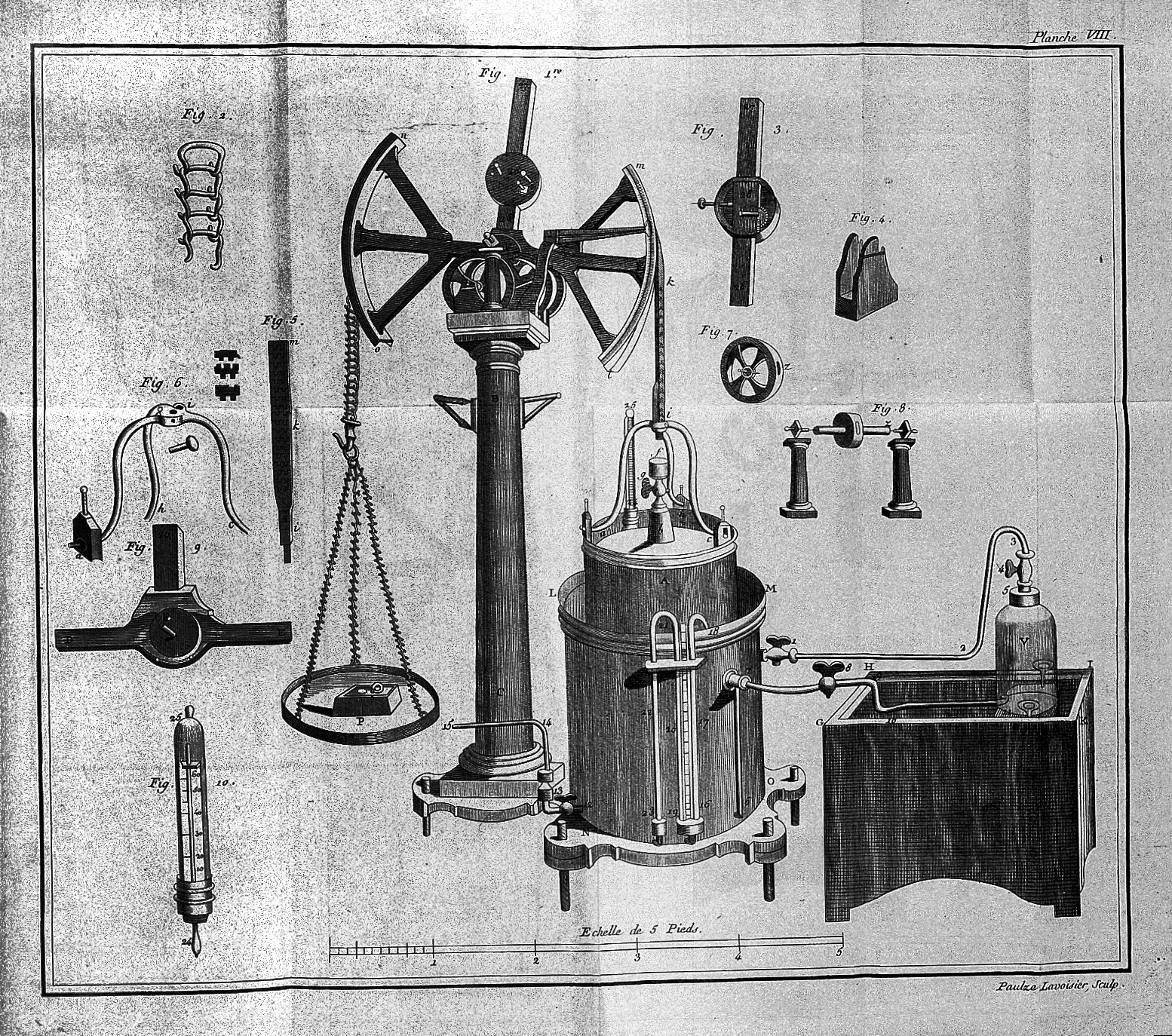
A Paulze Lavoisier illustration in Lavoisier's Traité Élémentaire de Chimie, Wellcome Collection

Paulze began receiving artistic instruction from the painter Jacques-Louis David in late 1785 or early 1786. Not long after, probably sometime in 1787, David painted a full-length double portrait of Paulze and her husband, foregrounding the former. Paulze's artistic training enabled her not only to document and illustrate her husband's experiments and publications (she even depicted herself as a participant in two drawings of her husband's experiments) but also to paint a portrait of Benjamin Franklin, one of the many scientific thinkers she hosted in her salons. Later, Paulze's ties with David were severed due to the radical politics of the latter in the context of the French Revolution.
