= Ridder (title) =

Noble rank in the Netherlands, Belgium and Denmark

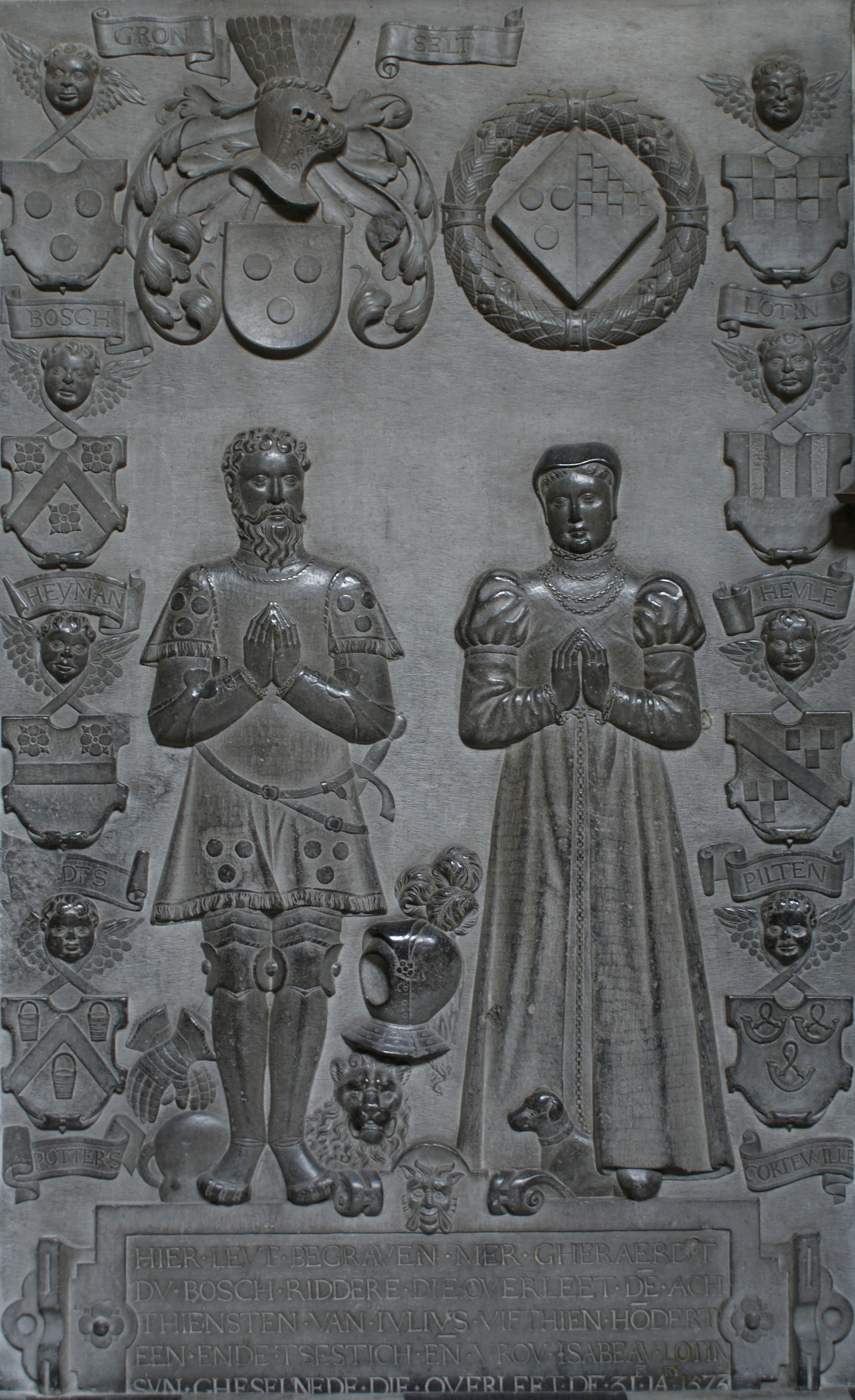
16th-century tomb effigy in St Martin's Church, Aalst, Belgium, of the Ridder Gheraerdt du Bosch and his lady Isabeau Lotin.

Ridder ([ˈrɪdər]; English: "Knight", French: Chevalier) is a noble title in Belgium, Denmark and the Netherlands. In modern usage, it denotes the second lowest rank within the nobility, standing below Baron, but above the untitled nobility (Jonkheer) in these countries. Prior to 1814 in the Low Countries, however, ridder was the highest rank within the nobility, ranking below the head of state and above the lords and untitled nobility.

"Ridder" is a literal translation of Latin Eques and originally meant "horseman" or "rider". For its historical association with warfare and the landed gentry in the Middle Ages, it can be considered roughly equal to the titles of "Knight" or "Baronet". In the Netherlands and Belgium no female equivalent exists. The collective term for its holders, in a certain area as an executive and legislative assembly, is named the Ridderschap (e.g. Ridderschap of Holland, Ridderschap of Friesland, etc.).

In modern times, the title of Ridder is often associated with certain orders of knighthood or decorations conferred by the reigning monarch or government to individuals for exceptional accomplishments in various fields such as arts, sciences, philanthropy, or public service.

== History ==
Before 1814, the history of nobility is separate for each of the eleven provinces that make up the Kingdom of the Netherlands. In each of these, there were in the Early Middle Ages a number of feudal lords, who often were just as powerful, and sometimes more so than the rulers themselves. During this period the nobility consisted of only of knights and lords.

In the middle of the fourteenth century, quarrels between the feudal lords reduced many families and castles to ruins, which contributed to the Dukes of Burgundy's acquisition by conquest or inheritance of many of the provinces forming the Kingdom of the Netherlands. In 1581, Philip II of Spain, heir of the Dukes of Burgundy was abjured by representatives of the Seven Provinces, which left a great part of the executive and legislative power to the Ridderschap of each province, which consisted of the representatives of those families of the old feudal nobility.

In 1798, the revolution did away with their power, and it was not before 1814, when William of Orange became King of the Netherlands that they were again appointed in another form, but by the time of the constitution of 1848, they had no influence in government affairs. In 1814, if no higher title was recognised, the men only were to bear the hereditary predicate of Jonkheer. The old feudal families obtained the title of Baron or Baroness for all their descendants.

== Inheritance ==
The hereditary title Ridder descends in two ways: "op allen" (to all – i.e. every male descendant, in the male line, is entitled to the title) and "met het recht op eerstgeboorte" (with the right of the first-born – i.e. descent by Salic law, i.e. the eldest male descendant of the title's first bearer may take the title, but not the others).

== Style of address ==
Normally one refers to or addresses a Ridder as De hoogwelgeboren heer (The high well-born Lord), [Forename] ridder [Surname]. Notice that the title is placed and written in lower case between the first name(s) and the family name. The wife of a ridder is referred to or addressed as De hoogwelgeboren vrouwe (The high well-born Lady), Mevrouw [Forename] [Surname husband]-[Maiden name]. As explained above no female Ridders exist. Children of hereditary Ridders who do not have a noble title are styled with the honorific Jonkheer or Jonkvrouw of the untitled nobility, i.e. De hoogwelgeboren heer, Jonkheer/Jhr. [Forename] [Surname] (male version) or De hoogwelgeboren vrouwe, Jonkvrouw/Jkvr. [Forename] [Surname] (female version).

== Coronet ==
Heraldic coronet of a Ridder

The coronet of rank for a hereditary Ridder is as follows: a plain circlet of gold with eight golden points, each topped with a pearl; five of them are seen in a 2-D representation. Furthermore, the golden circlet of the heraldic coronet is surrounded with a pearl collar.

== See also ==
- Ritter (title)
