= Christ Appointing Saint Roch as Patron Saint of Plague Victims =

Altarpiece by Peter Paul Rubens

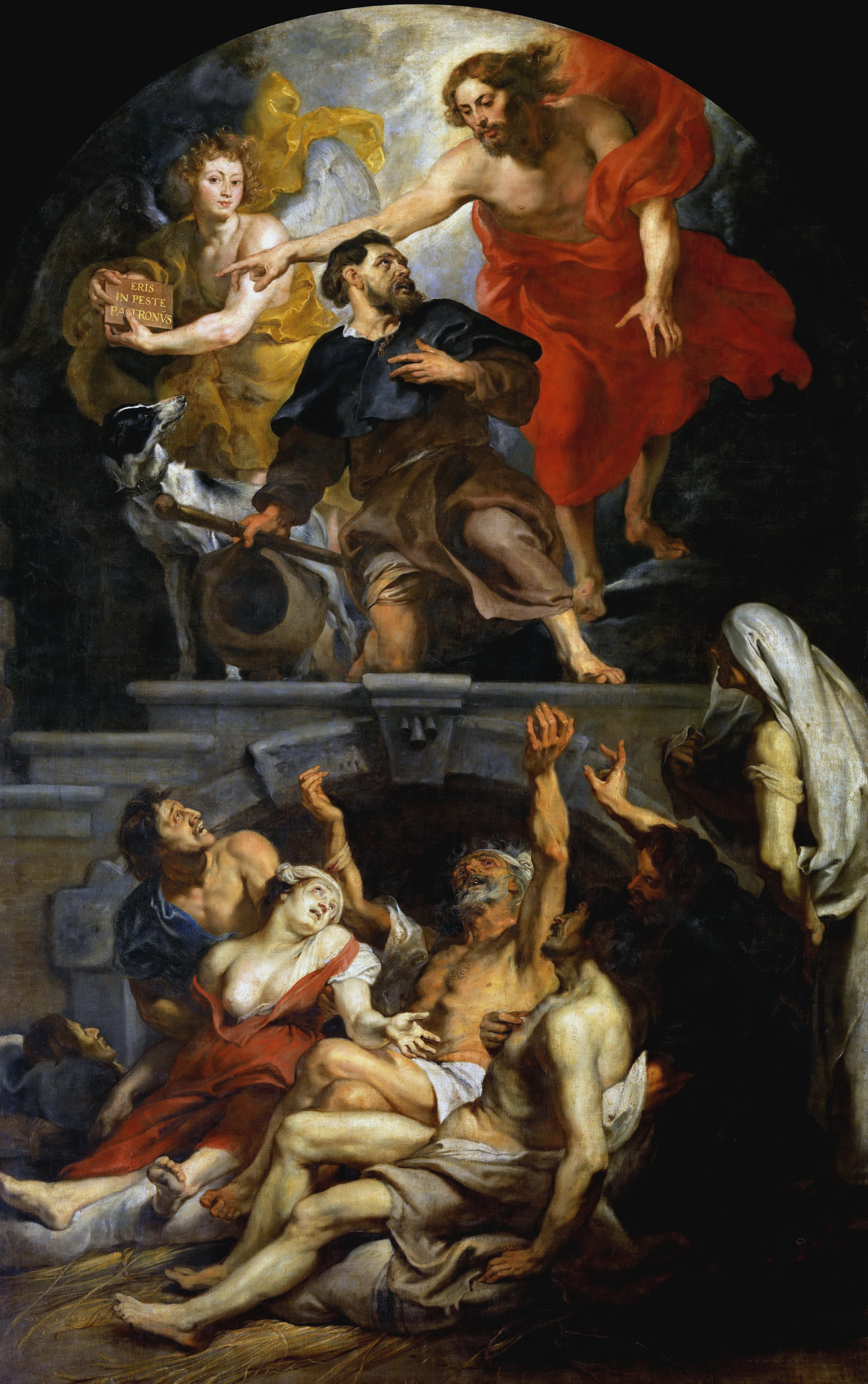
Christ Appointing Saint Roch as Patron Saint of Plague Victims (1623–1626) by Rubens

Christ Appointing Saint Roch as Patron Saint of Plague Victims or The Plague Victims is a 1623–1626 altarpiece by Peter Paul Rubens. It is located in the Sint-Martinuskerk in Aalst, Belgium and depicts Saint Roch.

== Background ==
Devastating epidemics of the plague had swept through Europe beginning in the sixteenth century, and Rubens was commissioned by the Brotherhood of Saint Roch to paint an altarpiece for the Church of St Martin in Aalst, Belgium, where the lay brotherhood were installing an altar to Saint Roch, patron saint of invalids, and specially invoked against the plague. He lived in the fourteenth century and is said to have effected many miraculous cures, by the sign of the cross, the touch of his hand and prayer. Legend relates that while ministering at Piacenza, he fell ill himself and was cast out from the town. He recovered from the illness while living in the forest, and is portrayed as a pilgrim with a hat and staff, and a bubo on his thigh (a relic of his illness). He is often accompanied by a dog, representing the dog that brought bread to him and licked his wounds when he was ill.

== The altarpiece ==
The overall dimensions of the altarpiece are 412 by 258 centimetres (162 by 102 in), with an arched top. In 1794, Napoleonic troops moved the painting, with its two predella panels, to the Louvre. It was returned to Aalst in 1814.

The altarpiece shows two groups of figures. In the upper group, Saint Roch is in prison praying for relief for those suffering from the plague. Then light bursts into the prison, a divine messenger appears accompanied by Christ himself; with his left hand Christ gestures towards the afflicted while with his right, he points to the golden inscription "Eris in peste patronus" (Thou shalt be the patron in the plague). Meanwhile, the lower group has become aware of the miracle taking place above, and are hopeful of recovery; even the shrouded figure on the right is hopeful of being raised from the dead.

In this picture, Rubens uses the "diagonals" technique often used by baroque painters, as a means to link the upper group of figures, who gesture and lean downwards, with the supplicants below, whose outstretched arms and gaze draw the eyes diagonally back upwards to the higher group.

The work is sometimes compared to Saint Roch Interceding with the Virgin for the Plague-Stricken, a 1780 painting by French artist Jacques-Louis David. In Rubens's painting, the plague victims are full of hope that they are about to receive relief, while in David's picture the victims are forlorn, apathetic and despairing.
