= Salon of 1781 =

1781 art exhibition in Paris

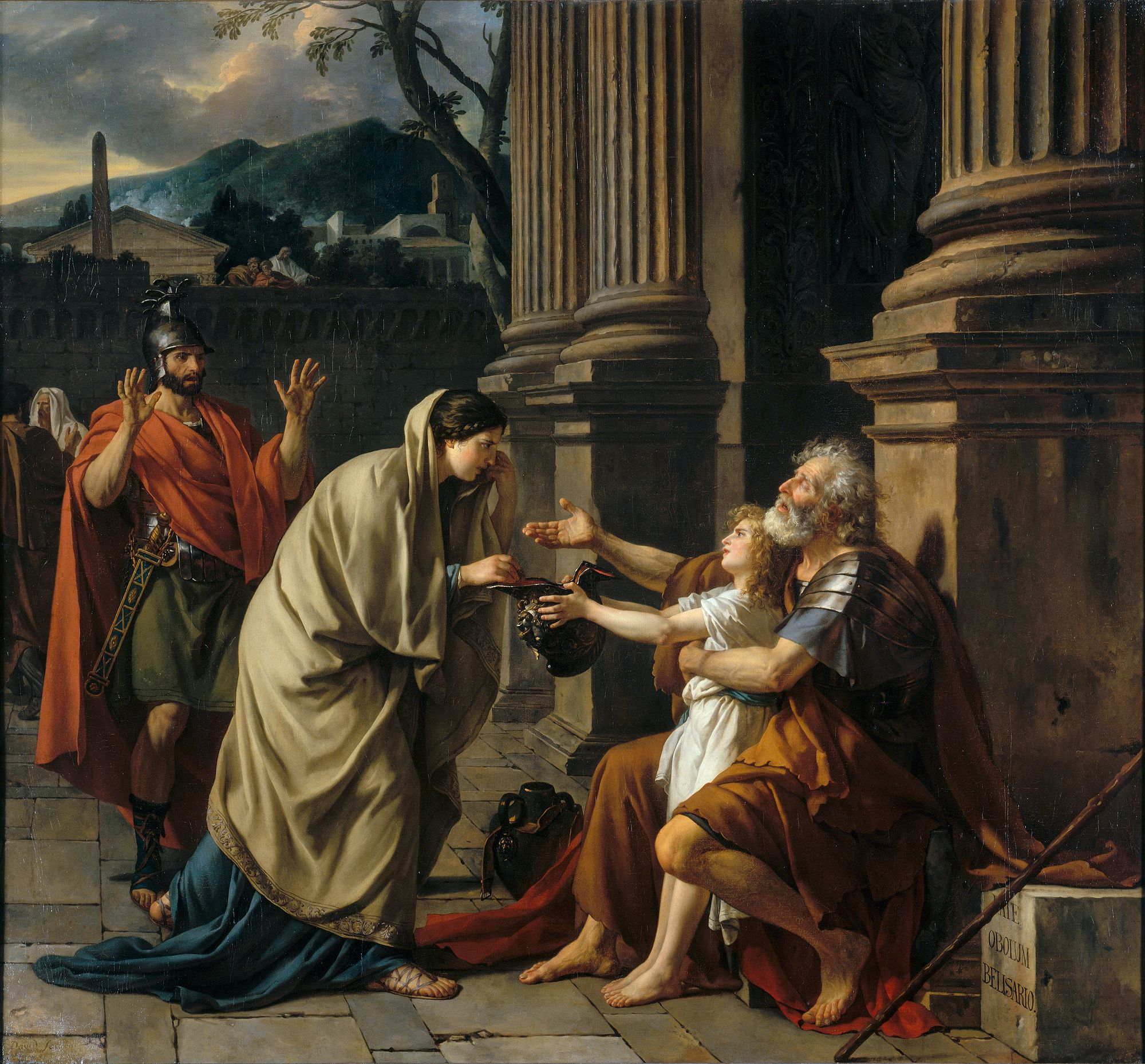
Belisarius Begging for Alms by Jacques-Louis David

The Salon of 1781 was an art exhibition held at the Louvre in Paris. Part of the regular series of Salons organised by the Académie Royale, it ran from 25 August to 25 September 1781. Held during the late Ancien régime period during the reign of Louis XVI, it featured submissions from noted painters, sculptors and architects. It took place while France was heavily engaged in the American War of Independence, and shortly after it closed French forces achieved a significant over Britain at the Siege of Yorktown. A portrait painting by Antoine-François Callet of the French Foreign Minister the Count of Vergennes, who had orchestrated the large coalition against Britain, was featured at the exhibition.

One of the most widely discussed paintings was Jacques-Louis David's Belisarius Begging for Alms. David had returned from Rome where he had been studying, and this painting features the Neoclassical style he was noted for. The work's positive reception marked a turning point in his career. David's rival François-André Vincent, who had made a major impression at the Salon of 1779, was less successful with The Intervention of the Sabine Women.

Nicolas Bernard Lépicié contributed a genre painting The Departure of the Poacher. Anne Vallayer-Coster submitted four still lifes and two portrait paintings. Hubert Robert displayed Fire at the Opera House, recording the aftermath of the recent blaze at the Théâtre du Palais-Royal. Likely inspired by the recent fire, Pierre-Antoine Demachy exhibited a much older depiction of the fire that had burned down the Théâtre de la foire in Saint-Germain in 1762.

In sculpture Jean-Jacques Caffieri displayed a bust of the seventeenth century playwright Molière, which was negatively compared to one Jean-Antoine Houdon had featured at the Salon of 1779.

== Gallery ==
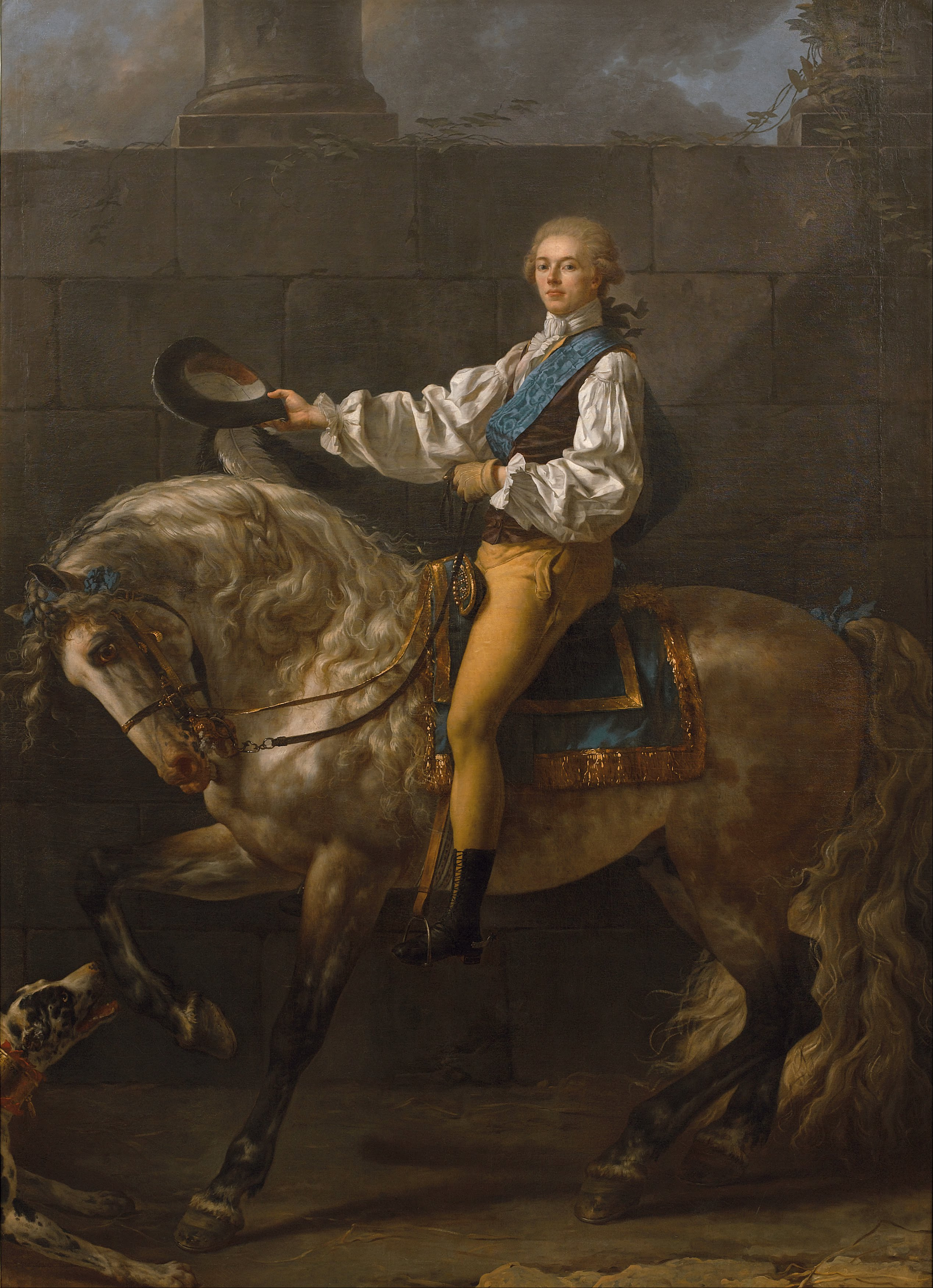
Equestrian Portrait of Count Stanislas Potocki by Jacques-Louis David

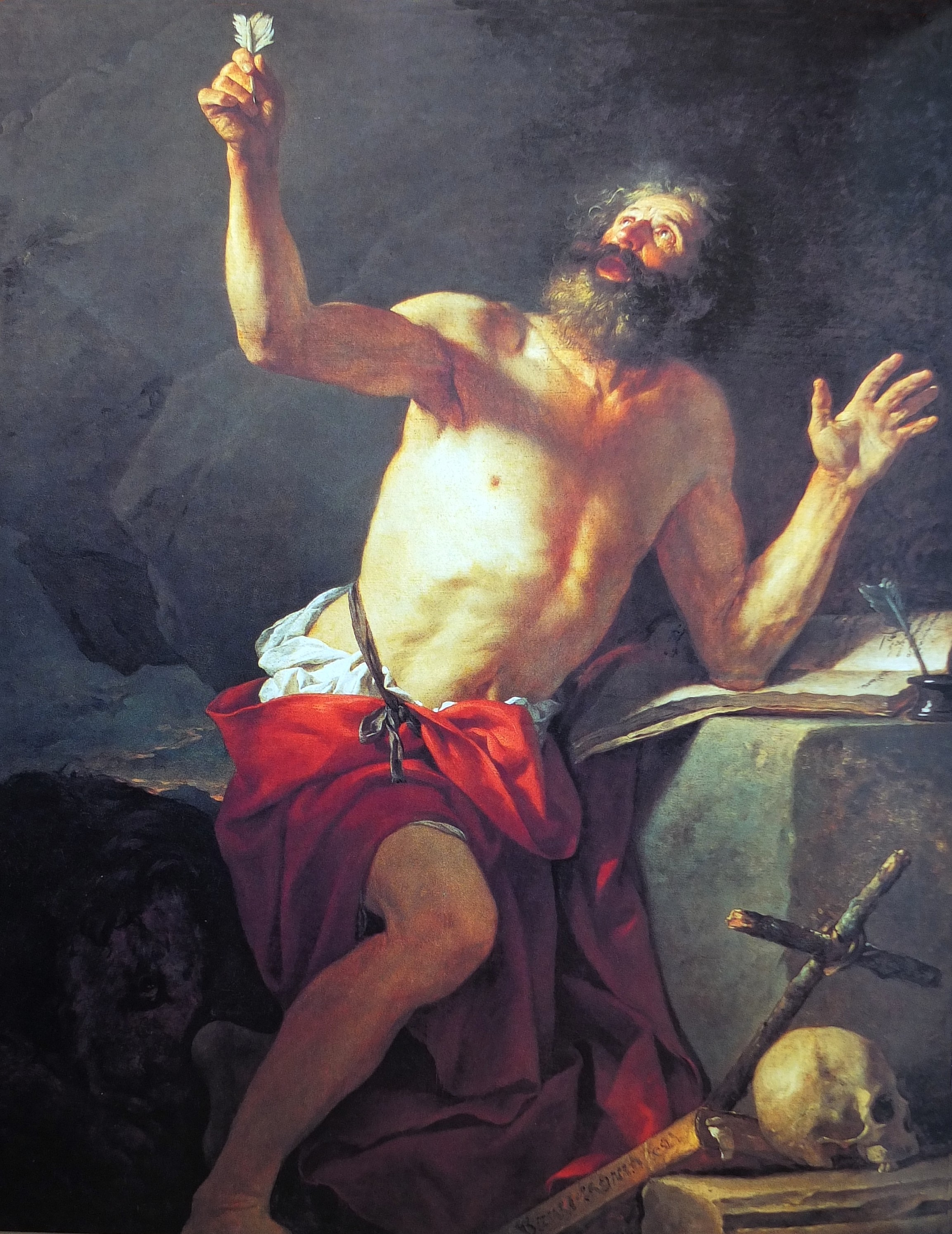
Saint Jerome Hears the Trumpet of the Last Judgment by Jacques-Louis David

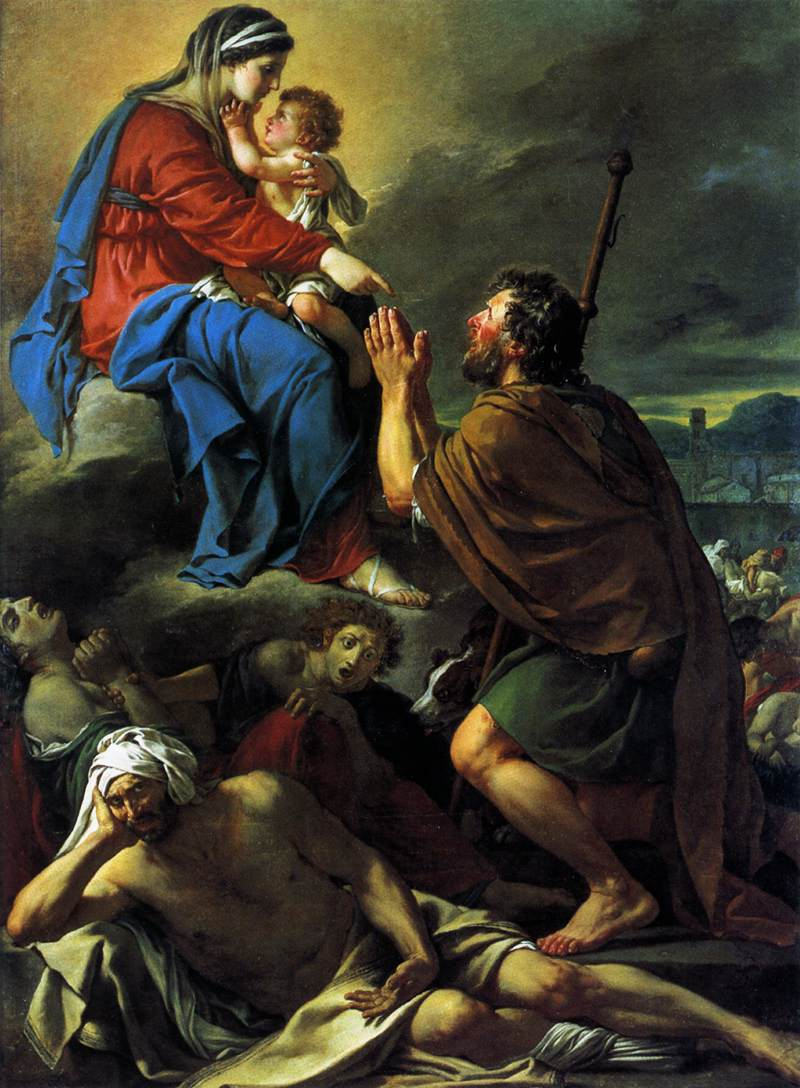
Saint Roch Interceding with the Virgin for the Plague-Stricken by Jacques-Louis David

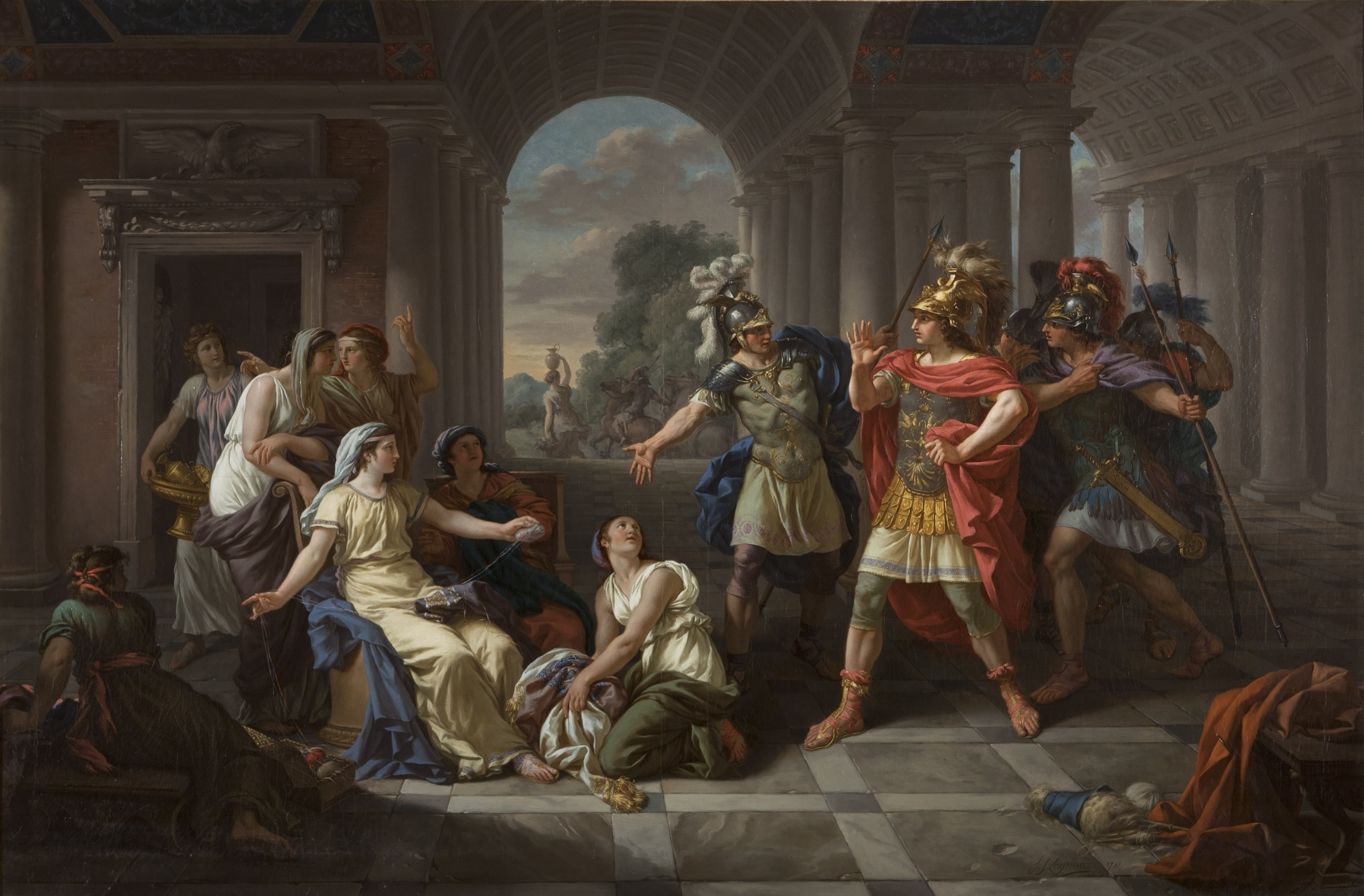
Tarquin's Sons Admiring Lucretia's Virtue by Jean-Jacques Lagrenée

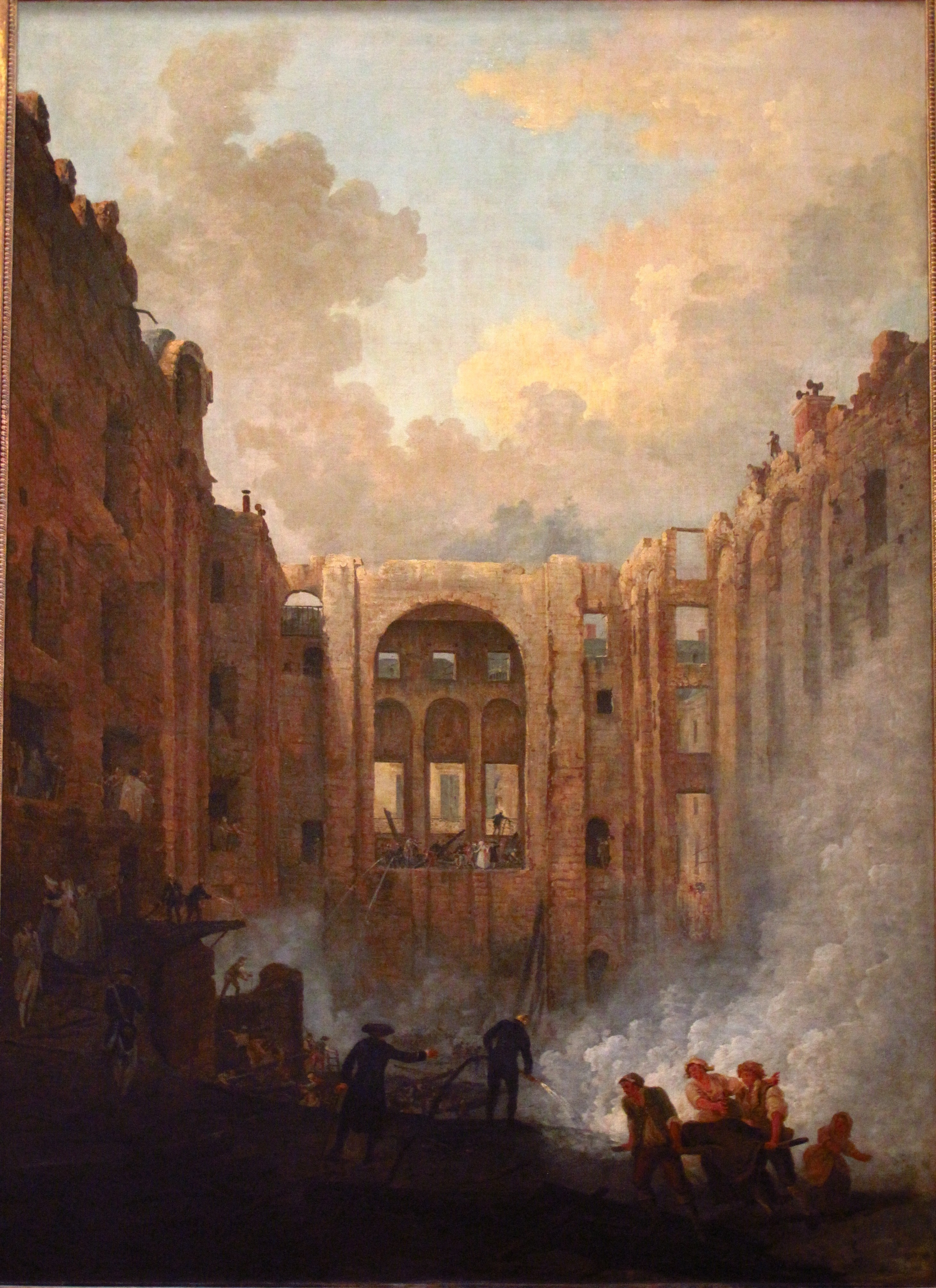
Fire at the Opera House by Hubert Robert

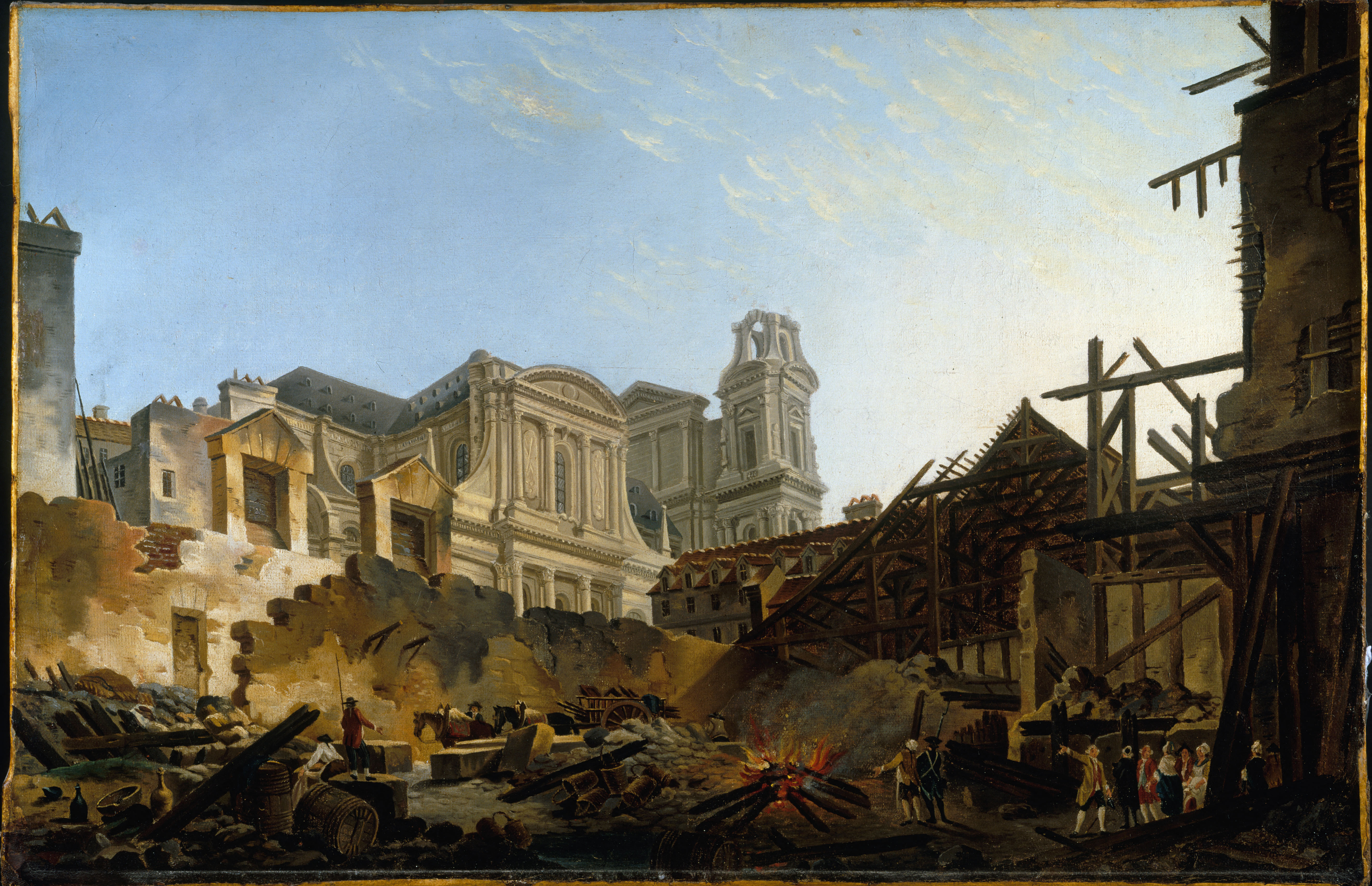
Foire Saint-Germain after the Fire of 1762 by Pierre-Antoine Demachy

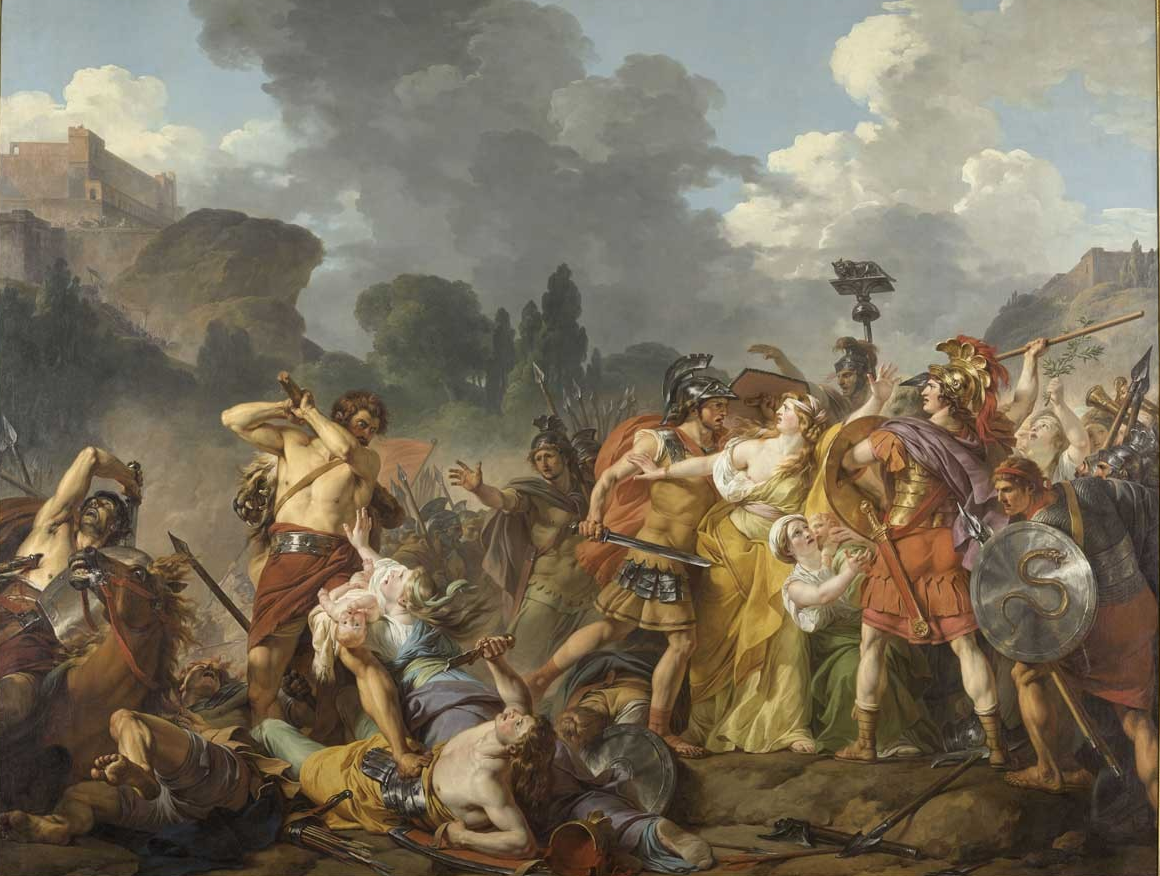
The Intervention of the Sabine Women by François-André Vincent

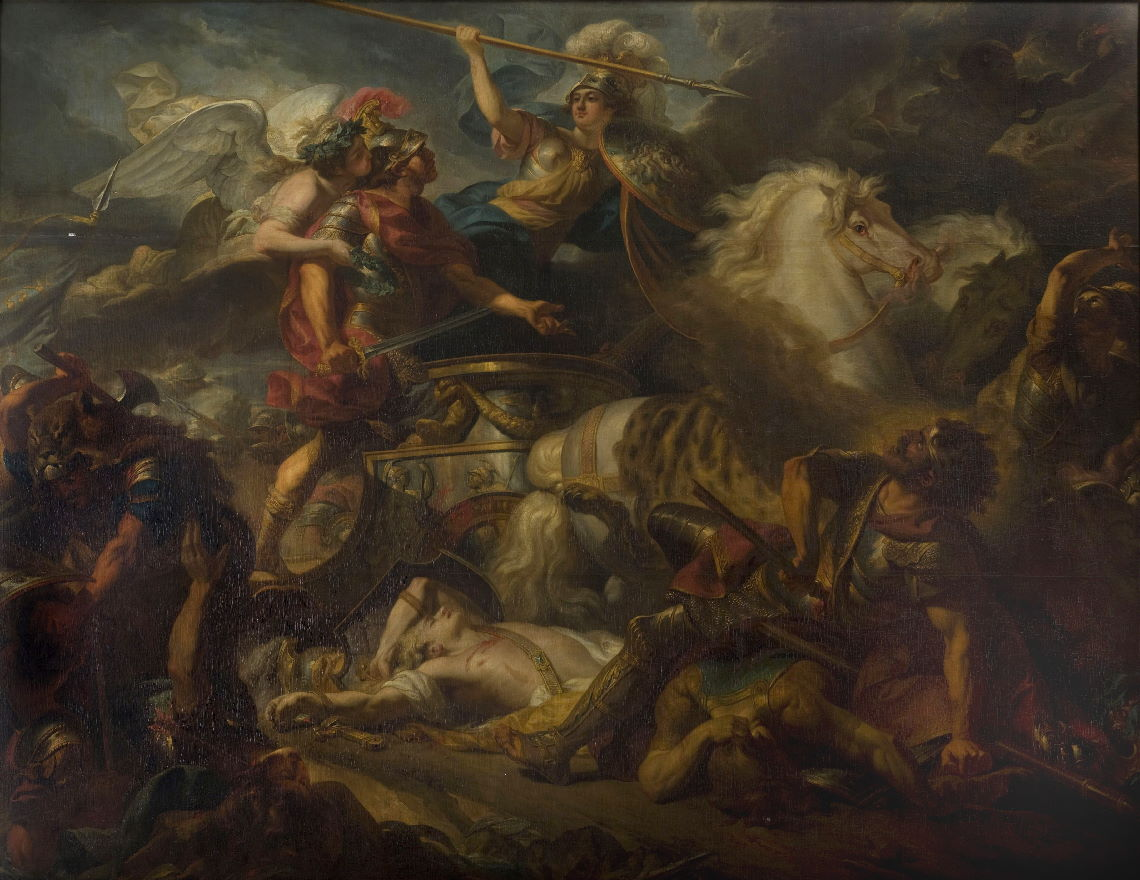
Mars Wounded by Diomedes by Gabriel François Doyen

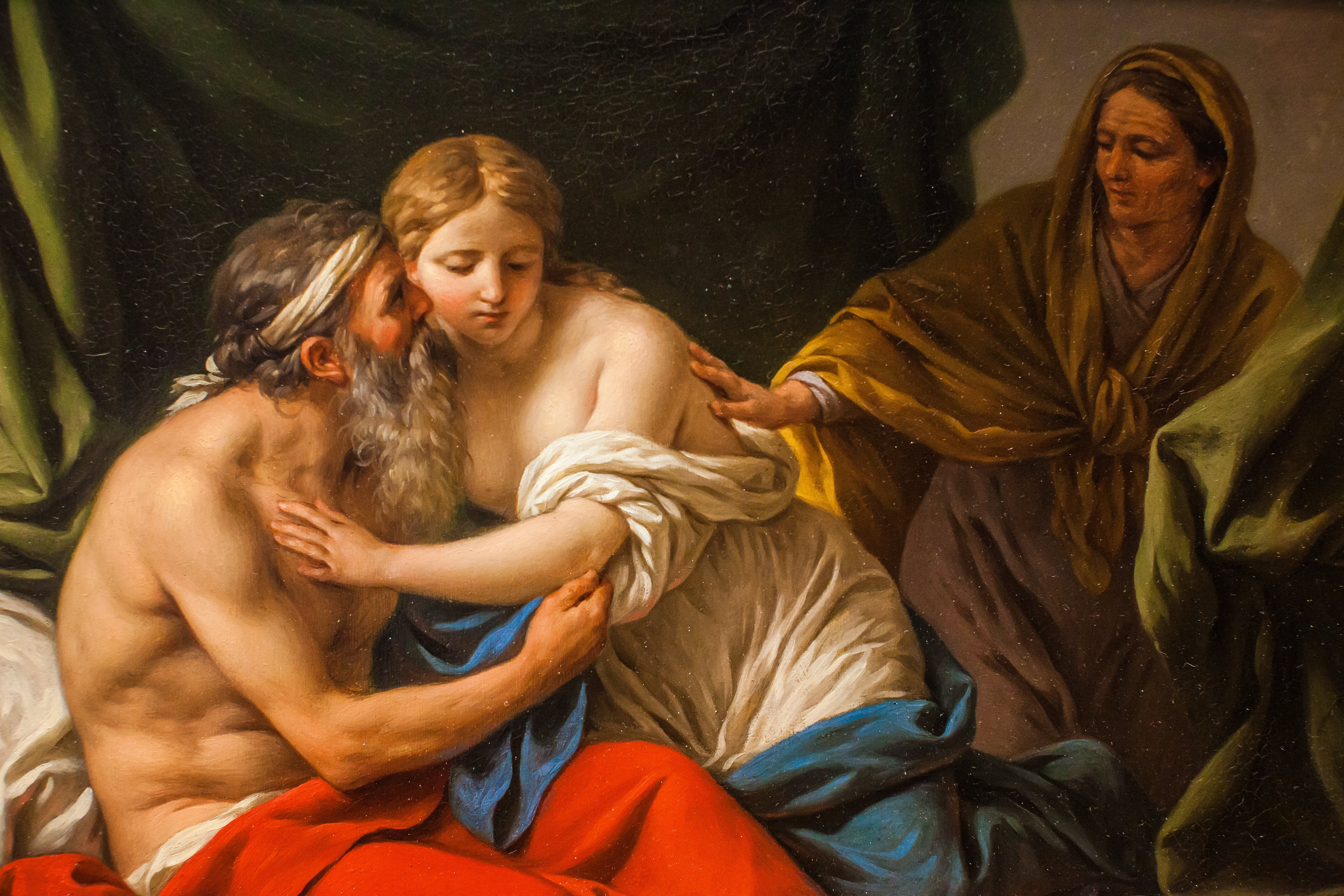
Sarah Presenting Hagar to Abraham by Louis-Jean-François Lagrenée

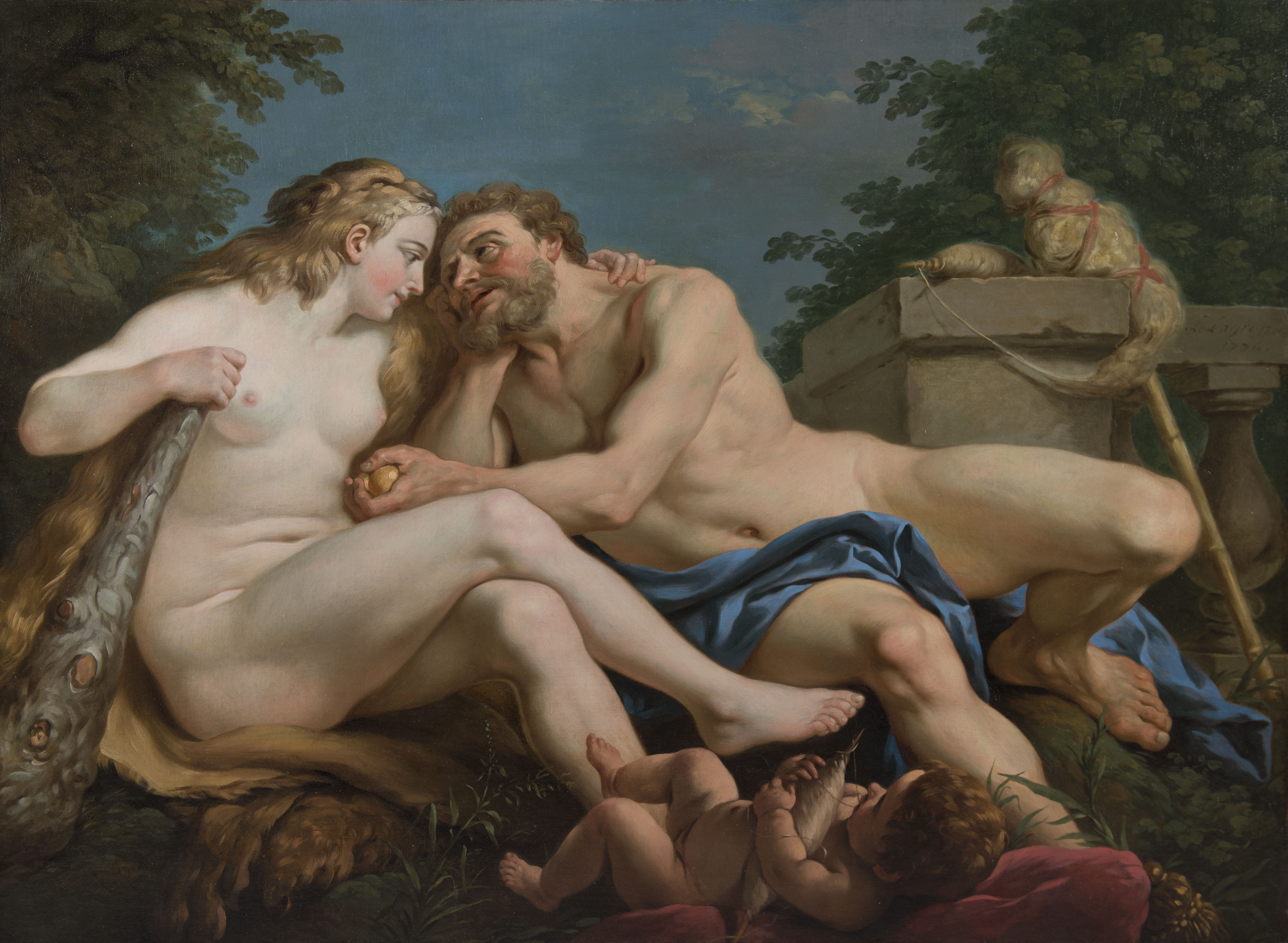
Hercules and Omphale by Louis-Jean-François Lagrenée

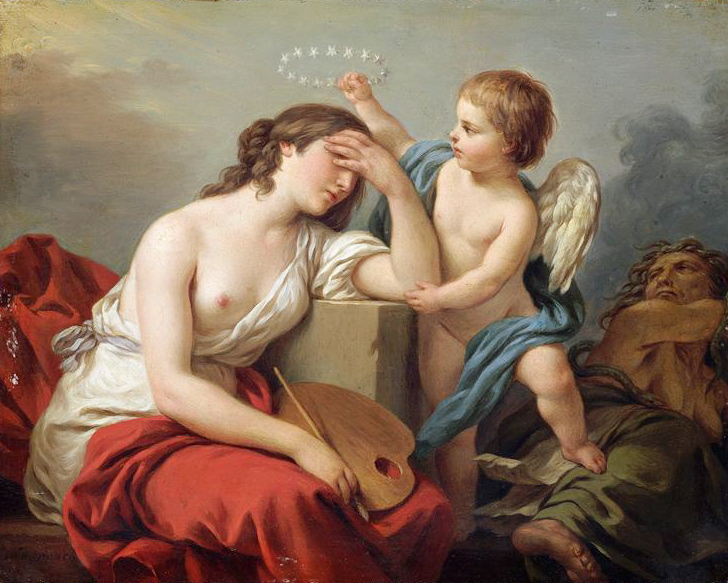
Love of the Arts Consoling Painting from the Criticism of Her Enemies by Louis-Jean-François Lagrenée

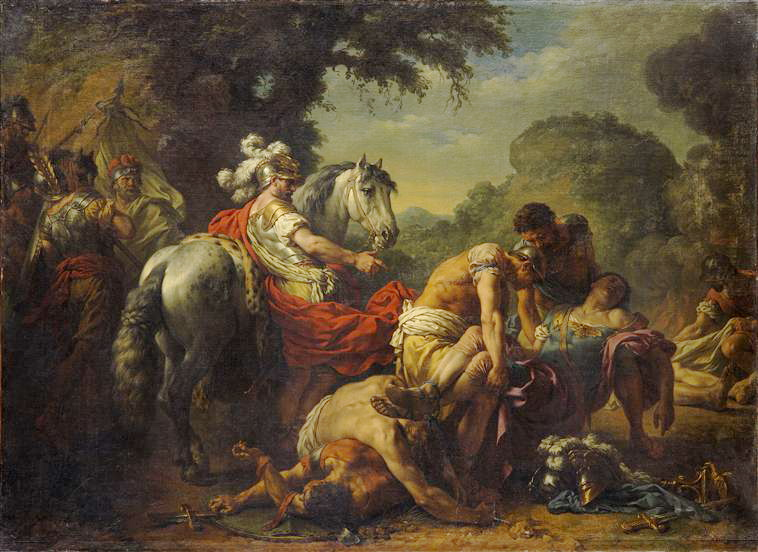
Hannibal Discovering the Body of Marcellus by Louis-Jean-François Lagrenée

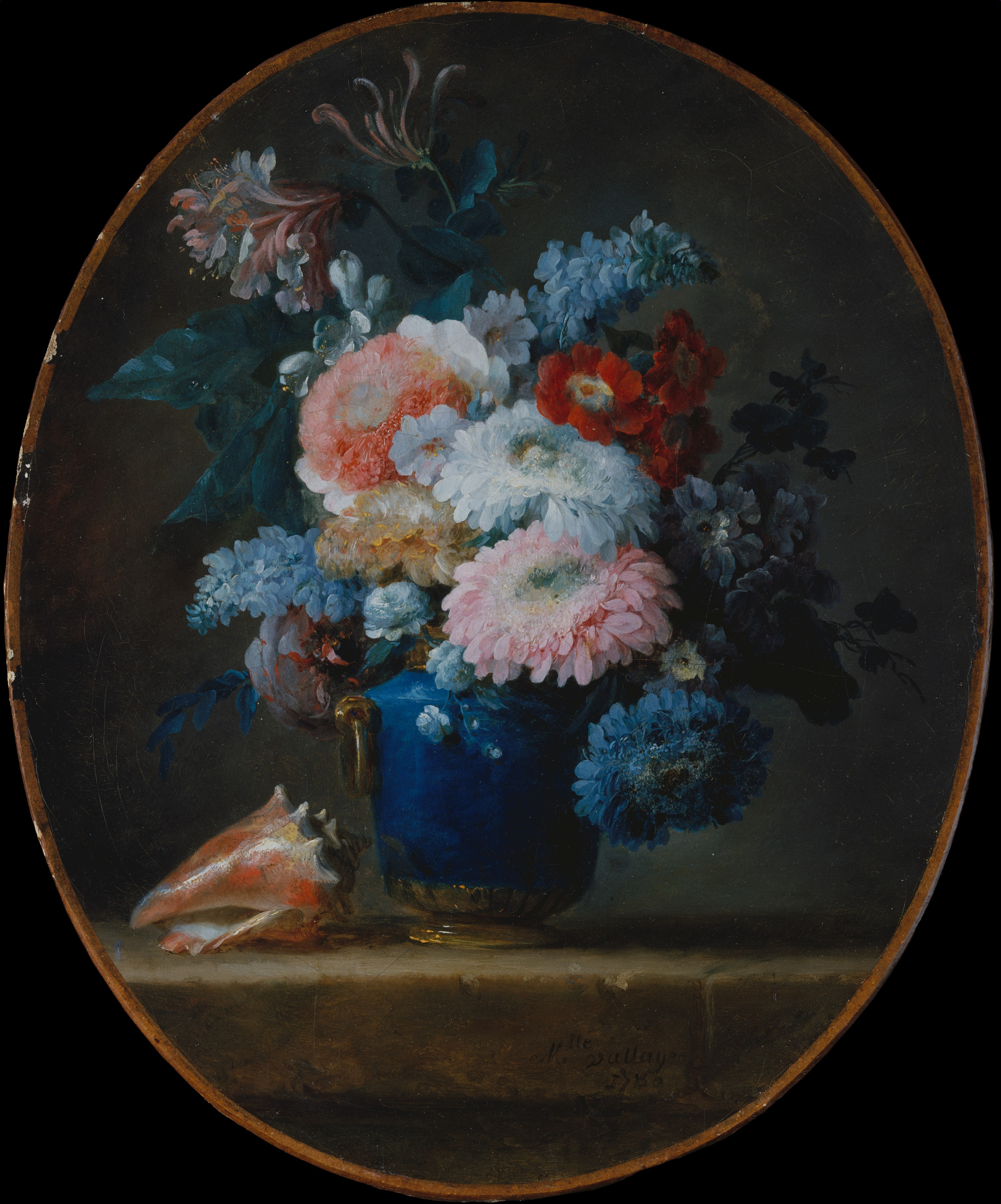
Vase of Flowers and Conch Shell by Anne Vallayer-Coster

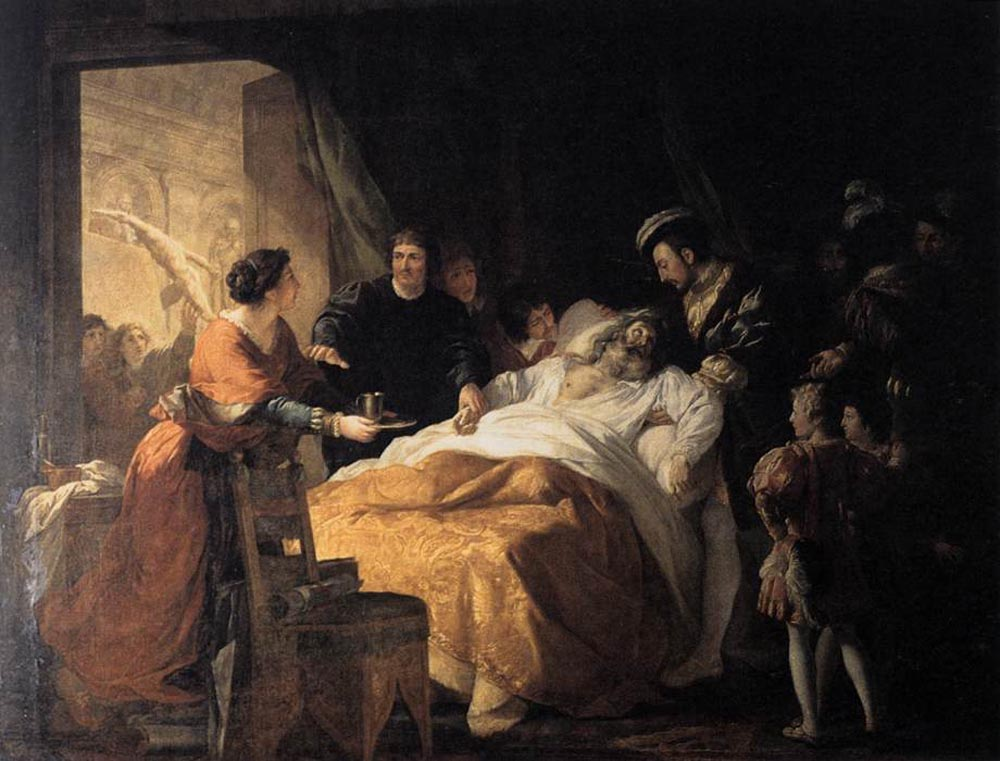
The Death of Leonardo by François-Guillaume Ménageot

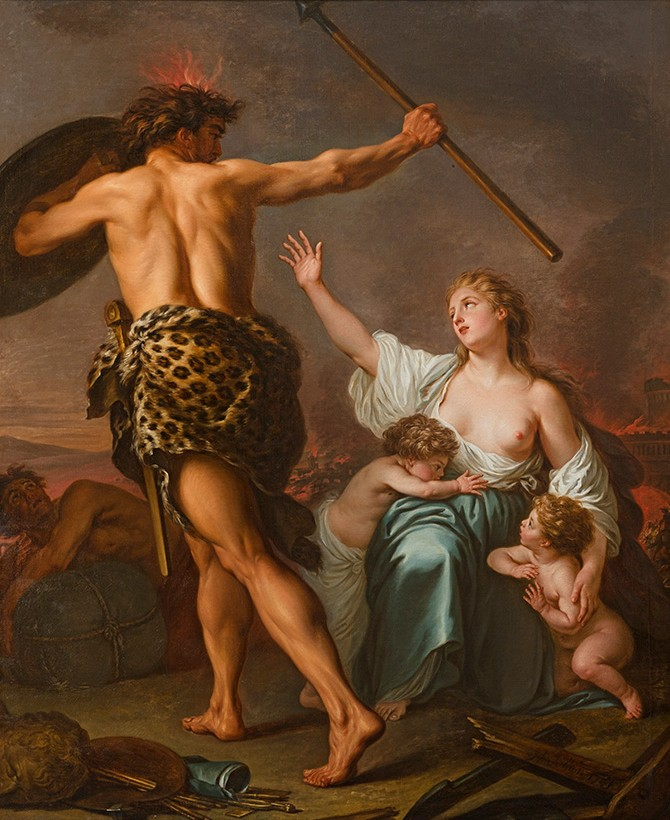
Humanity Attempting to Stop the Fury of the Demon of War by Nicolas-René Jollain

The Departure of the Poacher by Nicolas Bernard Lépicié

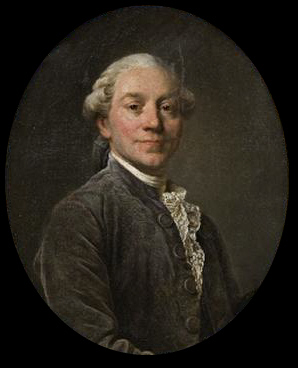
Portrait of Antoine-Léonard Thomas by Joseph Duplessis

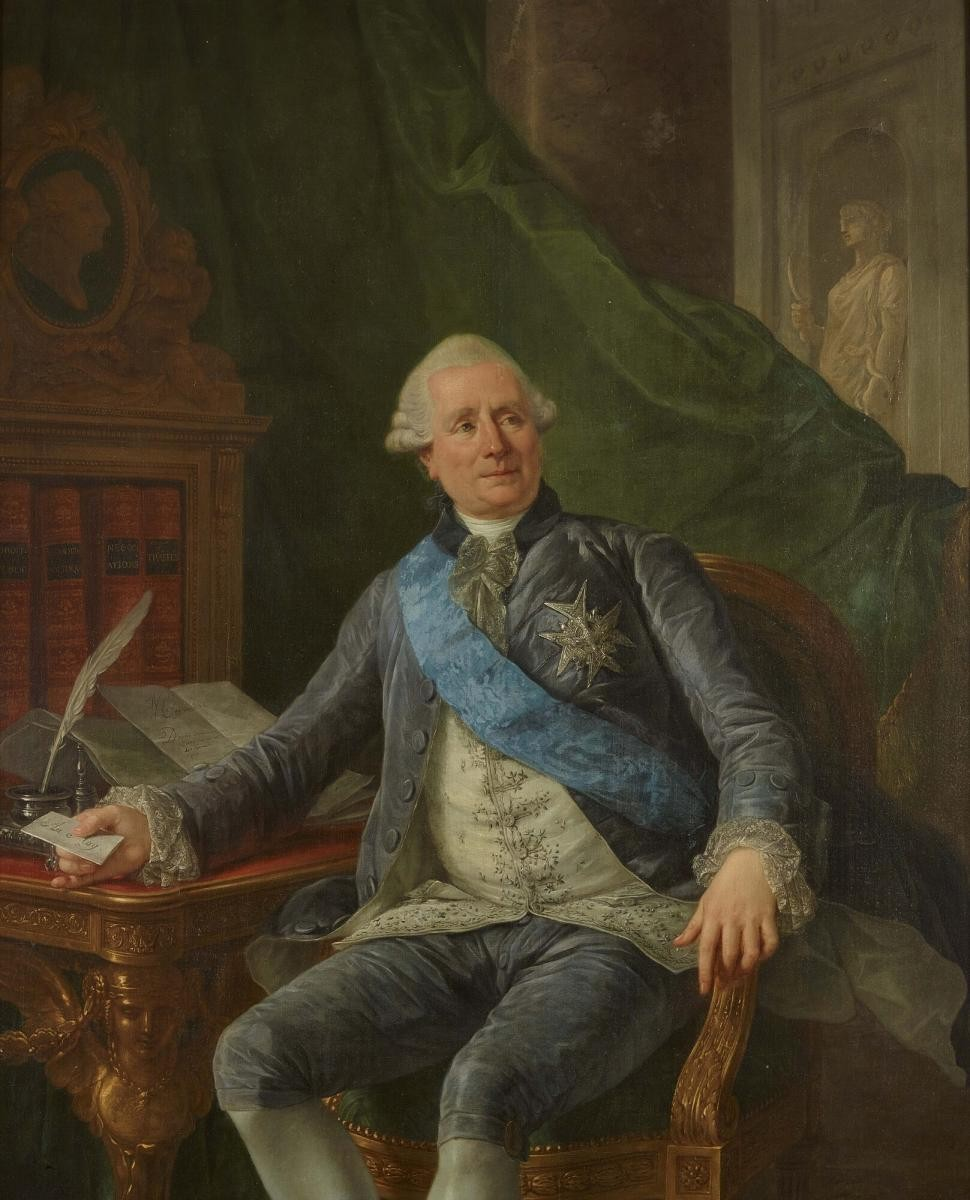
Portrait of the Comte de Vergennes by Antoine-François Callet

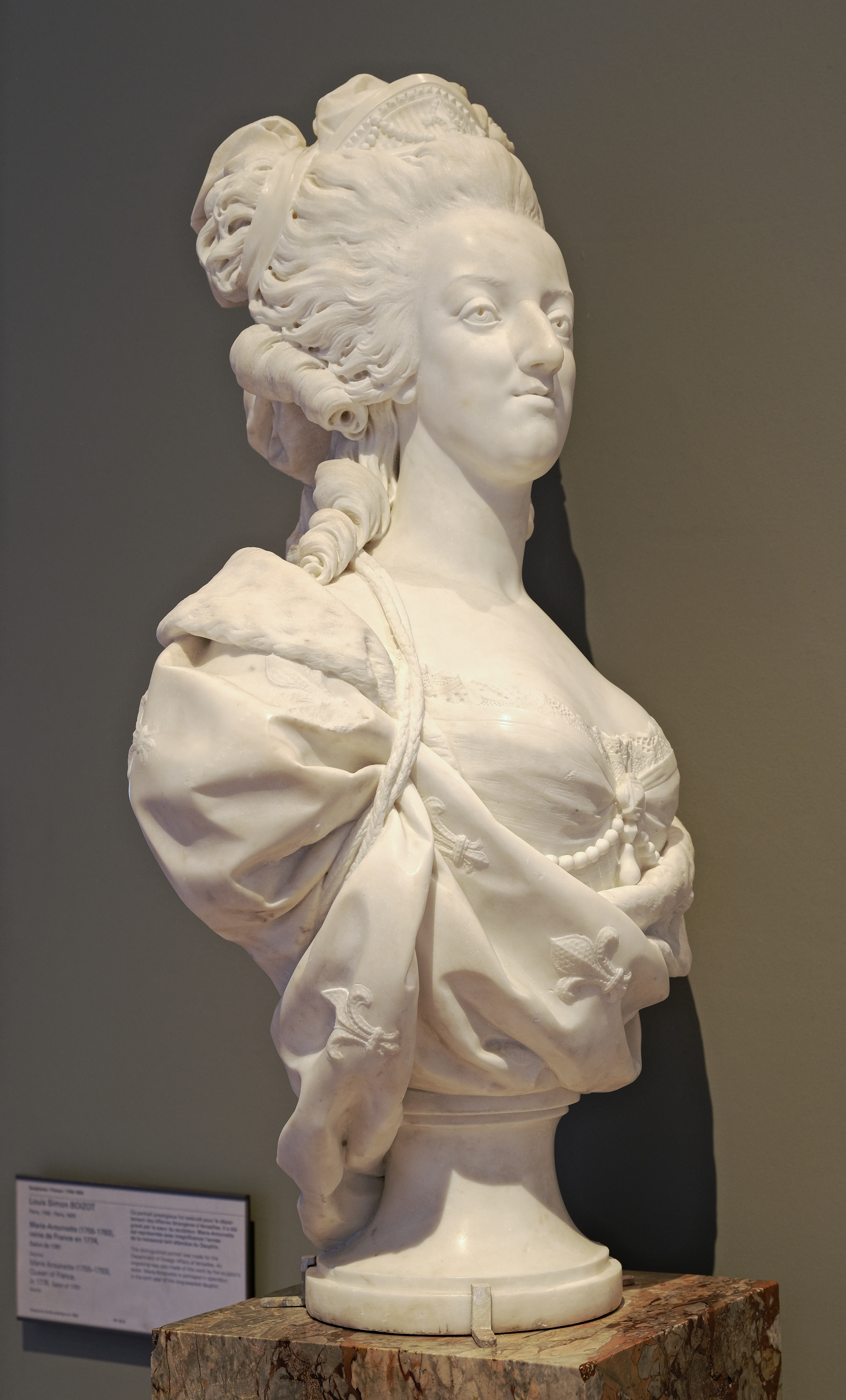
Marie Antoinette by Louis-Simon Boizot

== See also ==
- Royal Academy Exhibition of 1781, held in London

== Bibliography ==
- Bailey, Colin B. The Age of Watteau, Chardin, and Fragonard: Masterpieces of French Genre Painting. Yale University Press, 2003.
- Baetjer, Katharine. French Paintings in The Metropolitan Museum of Art from the Early Eighteenth Century through the Revolution. Metropolitan Museum of Art, 2019.
- Dubin, Nina L. Futures & Ruins: Eighteenth-century Paris and the Art of Hubert Robert. Getty Publications, 2010.
- Levey, Michael. Painting and Sculpture in France, 1700-1789. Yale University Press, 1993.
- Mansfield, Elizabeth C. The Perfect Foil: François-André Vincent and the Revolution in French Painting. University of Minnesota Press, 2011.
- Poulet, Anne L. Jean-Antoine Houdon: Sculptor of the Enlightenment. University of Chicago Press, 2003.
