= The Intervention of the Sabine Women (Vincent) =

Painting by François-André Vincent

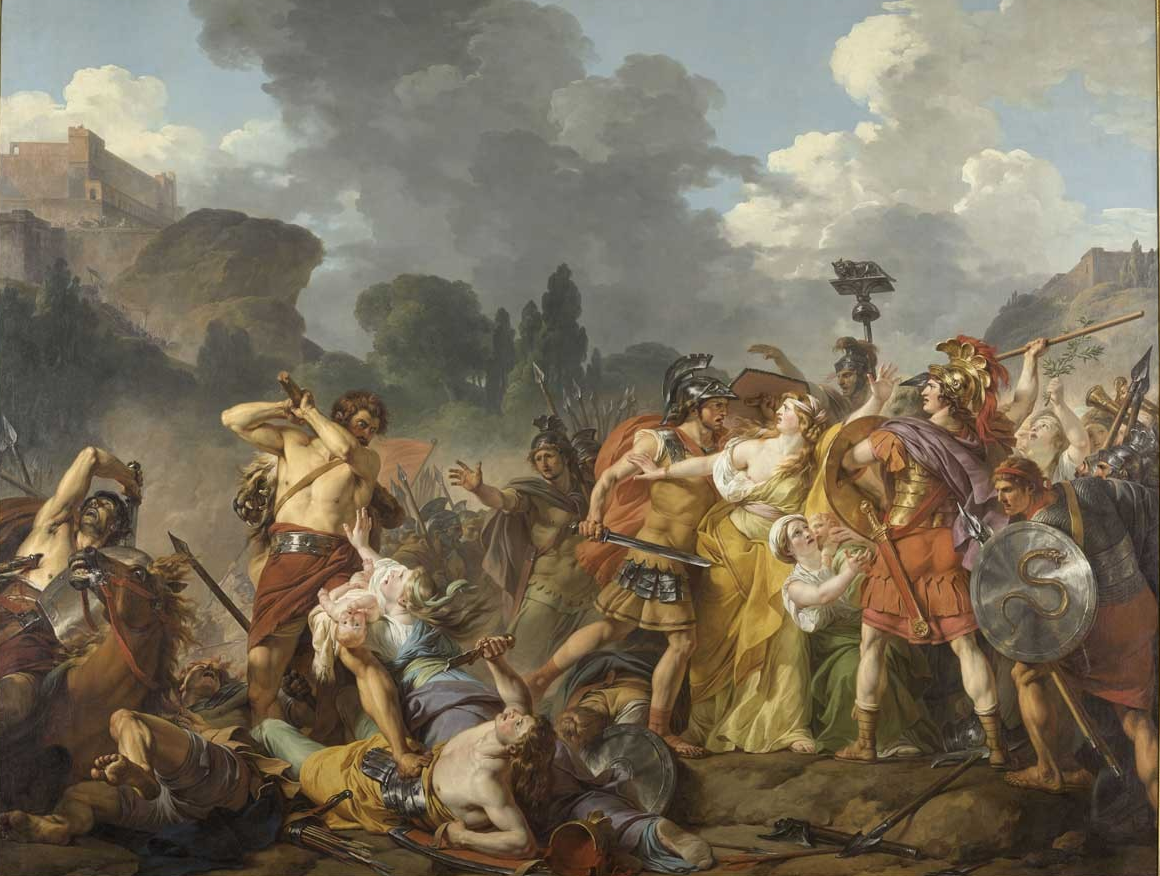
- Artist: François-André Vincent
- Year: 1781
- Type: Oil on canvas, history painting
- Dimensions: 325 cm × 423 cm (128 in × 167 in)
- Location: Musée des Beaux-Arts, Angers

The Intervention of the Sabine Women is a 1781 history painting by the French artist François-André Vincent. It features a legendary scene from the founding period of Rome. Following abduction of the Sabine Women by the Romans, the women intercede to try and halt the bloodshed between them and the avenging Sabines. Neoclassical in style, the painting was exhibited at the Salon of 1781 held at the Louvre in Paris. Today it is in the collection of the Musée des Beaux-Arts in Angers.

Vincent's rival Jacques-Louis David produced his own painting inspired by the same subject The Intervention of the Sabine Women in 1799. David may have drawn the germ of his composition from Vincent's earlier work.

== Bibliography ==
- Mansfield, Elizabeth C. The Perfect Foil: François-André Vincent and the Revolution in French Painting. University of Minnesota Press, 2011.
- Sitzia, Emilie Art in Literature, Literature in Art in 19th Century France. Cambridge Scholars Publishing, 2011.
- Stein, Perrin. Jacques Louis David: Radical Draftsman. Metropolitan Museum of Art, 2022.
