= Saint Roch Interceding with the Virgin for the Plague-Stricken =

Painting by Jacques-Louis David

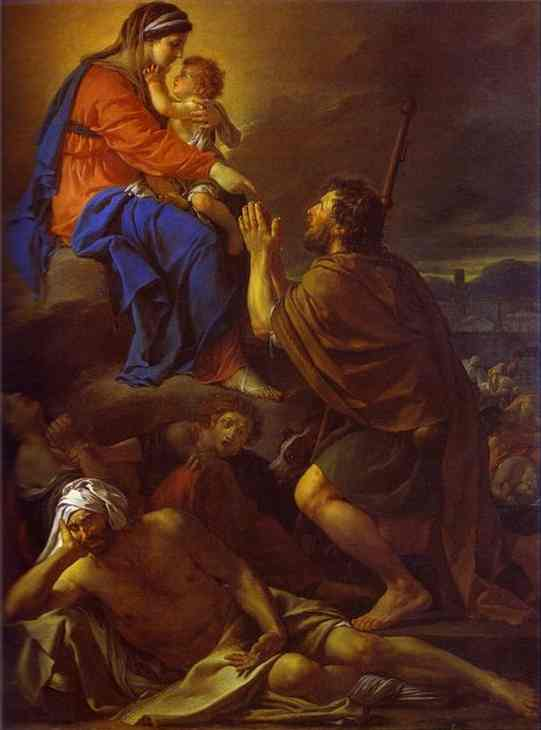
- Artist: Jacques-Louis David
- Year: 1780
- Medium: Oil on canvas
- Dimensions: 260 cm × 195 cm (100 in × 77 in)
- Location: Musée des Beaux-Arts; Marseille

Saint Roch Interceding with the Virgin for the Plague-Stricken is an early religious painting by the French artist Jacques-Louis David. It shows Saint Roch interceding to the Virgin Mary and Christ Child for the plague sufferers shown around him. He painted it in 1780 during his stay at the Villa Medici in Rome after winning first prize for painting in the Prix de Rome (before his Portrait of count Stanislas Potocki) and exhibited it at the Salon of 1781 at the Louvre on his return to France. While in Rome he was much influenced by the works of Caravaggio, Poussin, Guercino and Lebrun. He was determined not to be seduced by the Italian baroque style, declaring "the Antique will not seduce me, it lacks animation, it does not move". Nevertheless, he filled twelve sketchbooks with drawings while he was in Rome, and he and his studio used them as models for the rest of his life.

== Background ==
Saint Roch is, among other things, the patron saint of invalids, and is specially invoked against the plague. Having recovered from the illness himself, he is portrayed as a pilgrim with a staff and a bubo on his thigh (a relic of his illness), and is often accompanied by a dog, representing the dog that brought him bread and licked his wounds when he was ill.

== The painting ==
In the painting, Saint Roch is in the middle on the right, looking up at the Virgin Mary and the Christ Child at top left. Saint Roch is recognisable from his pilgrim's attire, the bubo on his leg and the dog behind him. He is pleading to Mary for her intercession. To the bottom left is a tight-knit group of sufferers sitting and lying on the ground. Mary is dressed in bright blue and red robes and is playing with the Baby, seemingly indifferent to the plight of the men below. They are painted in sombre browns and greys, and their suffering is emphasized by a glimpse in the middle distance on the right of victims lying in a stupor and being carried away in a cart.

The picture is an oil-on-canvas work measuring 260 by 195 cm (102 by 77 in). It is now in the Musée des beaux-arts de Marseille, France.

== Reception ==
The picture has been compared to, and may have been influenced by, Christ Appointing Saint Roch as Patron Saint of Plague Victims, a 1623-1626 altarpiece by Peter Paul Rubens. In Rubens's picture, the plague victims are hopeful, seeing Saint Roch and Christ above them as their saviours, about to cure them. David's victims on the other hand are apathetic, they see themselves as doomed; one gazes at the viewer in silent reproach, another makes a frantic movement that seems to lack purpose, and a third looks up at Saint Roch and the Virgin Mary with closed eyes. Even Saint Roch and the Virgin Mary appear unconnected as if separated by a glass screen. He looks up and pleads with her but their hands do not touch; she seems unaware of his presence and is gesturing towards something in the middle distance.

== See also ==
- List of paintings by Jacques-Louis David
