= Saint Jerome Hears the Trumpet of the Last Judgment =

Painting by Jacques-Louis David

- Saint Jérôme entendant la trompette du Jugement dernier (French)
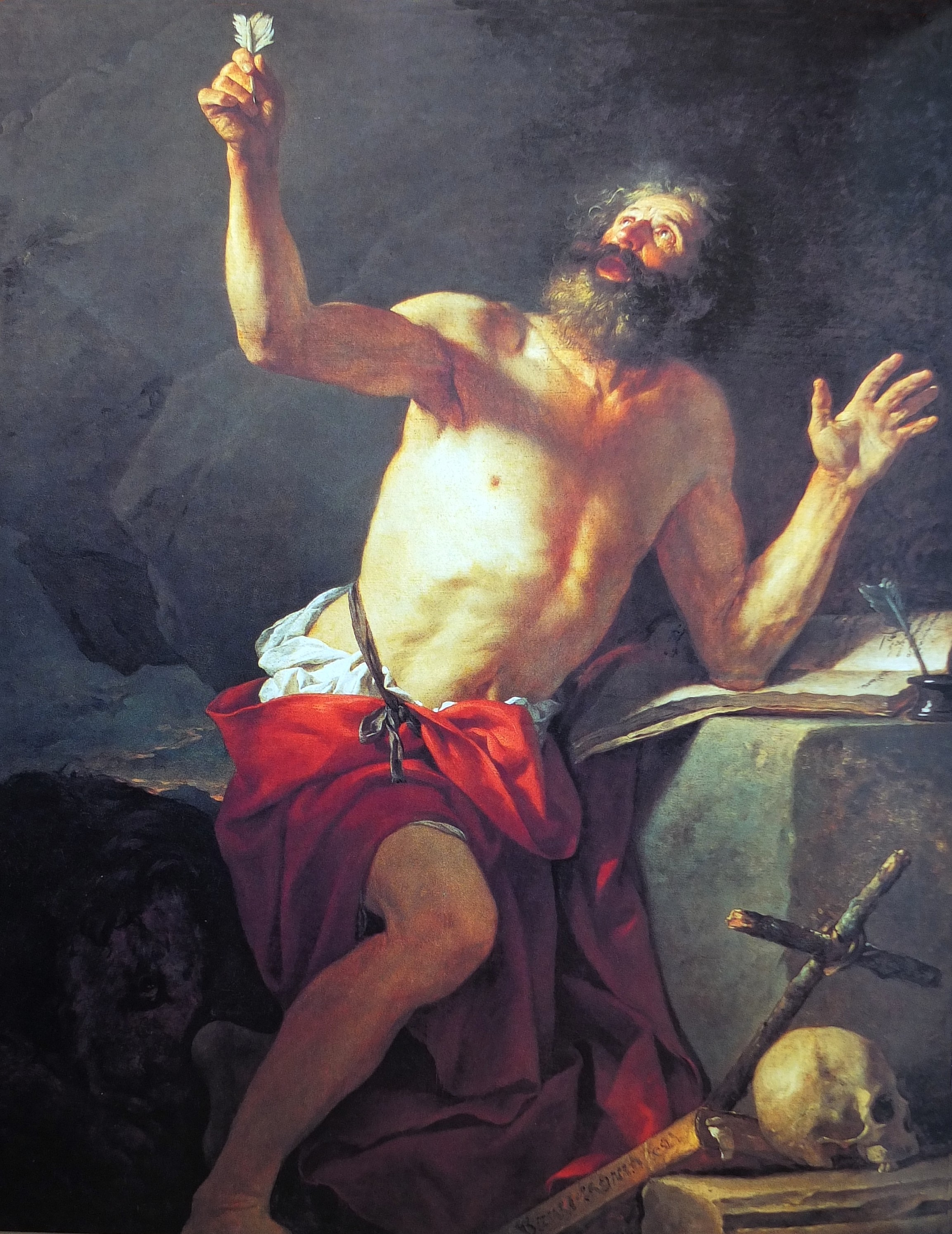
- Artist: Jacques-Louis David
- Year: 1779
- Subject: Jerome
- Location: Montreal Museum of Fine Arts on loan from the Musée de la civilisation
- Owner: Notre‑Dame‑de‑Québec Parish Corporation

Saint Jerome Hears the Trumpet of the Last Judgment is a 1779 painting by the French artist Jacques-Louis David. It was exhibited at the Salon of 1781 at the Louvre in Paris

== Description ==
Jerome, one of the four Doctors of the Church, is depicted as a half-clad anchorite in his cell, with common iconographical attributes, a cross, a skull and bible. He is holding a quill in his right hand, indicating that he is writing the Vulgate. He is wearing the red garb of a cardinal, indicative of his role as secretary to Pope Damasus I. The skull alludes to this intellectual and penitential life.

== Provenance ==
The painting came to Quebec City between 1901 and 1908, owned by Henriette and Geneviève Cramail. After David's death in 1825, the painting entered the collection of Cardinal Joseph Fesch, and then in the collection of Cramail sisters' grandfather, the history and genre painter Gustave Mailand (1810–1880).

It was donated by the sisters to the parish of Notre-Dame de Québec in 1938, to replace works of art that were lost in a fire at the cathedral in 1922. From 1995 to 2013, the painting was on display at the National Gallery of Canada. It was subsequently in storage at the Musée de la civilisation in Quebec City for conservation. It currently hangs in the Montreal Museum of Fine Arts (MMFA).

== Sale ==
The parish of Notre-Dame de Québec, looking to raise operating funds, approached the Musée de la civilisation, the Montreal Museum of Fine Arts and the National Gallery of Canada in 2016. The cost of the painting nearly equalled the entire acquisition budget of the National Gallery (8-million). The National Gallery of Canada has valued the painting at US$5 million. The asking price was CA$6.3 million. The gallery made an initial offer of CA$3 million that the parish refused. When it did not find a buyer it started to approach international institutions. The National Gallery made in bid in December 2017 that was conditional on the sale of a Chagall painting at auction on May 15, 2018. The Musée de la civilisation and Montreal Museum of Fine Arts have made attempts to raise funds to buy the painting together.

Nathalie Bondil, director of the Montreal Museum of Fine Arts has claimed that St. Jerome was not in danger of being sold to foreign buyers because that wouldn't be allowed under Quebec's Cultural Heritage Act. Marie Montpetit, Quebec's Minister of Culture and Communications announced on April 23, 2018, that the province of Quebec issued a notice of intent to have Saint Jerome classified as a heritage document. On the same day, Françoise Lyon, chair of the board, and Marc Mayer, director of the National Gallery said the gallery would halt its efforts to obtain the painting.

Saint Jerome is one of only two paintings by David in a Canadian collection, the other one a small portrait of Pierre Sériziat from 1790, in the collection of the National Gallery.

== See also ==
- List of paintings by Jacques-Louis David
