= St Martin's Church, Aalst =

St Martin's Church
- Dutch: Sint-Martinuskerk
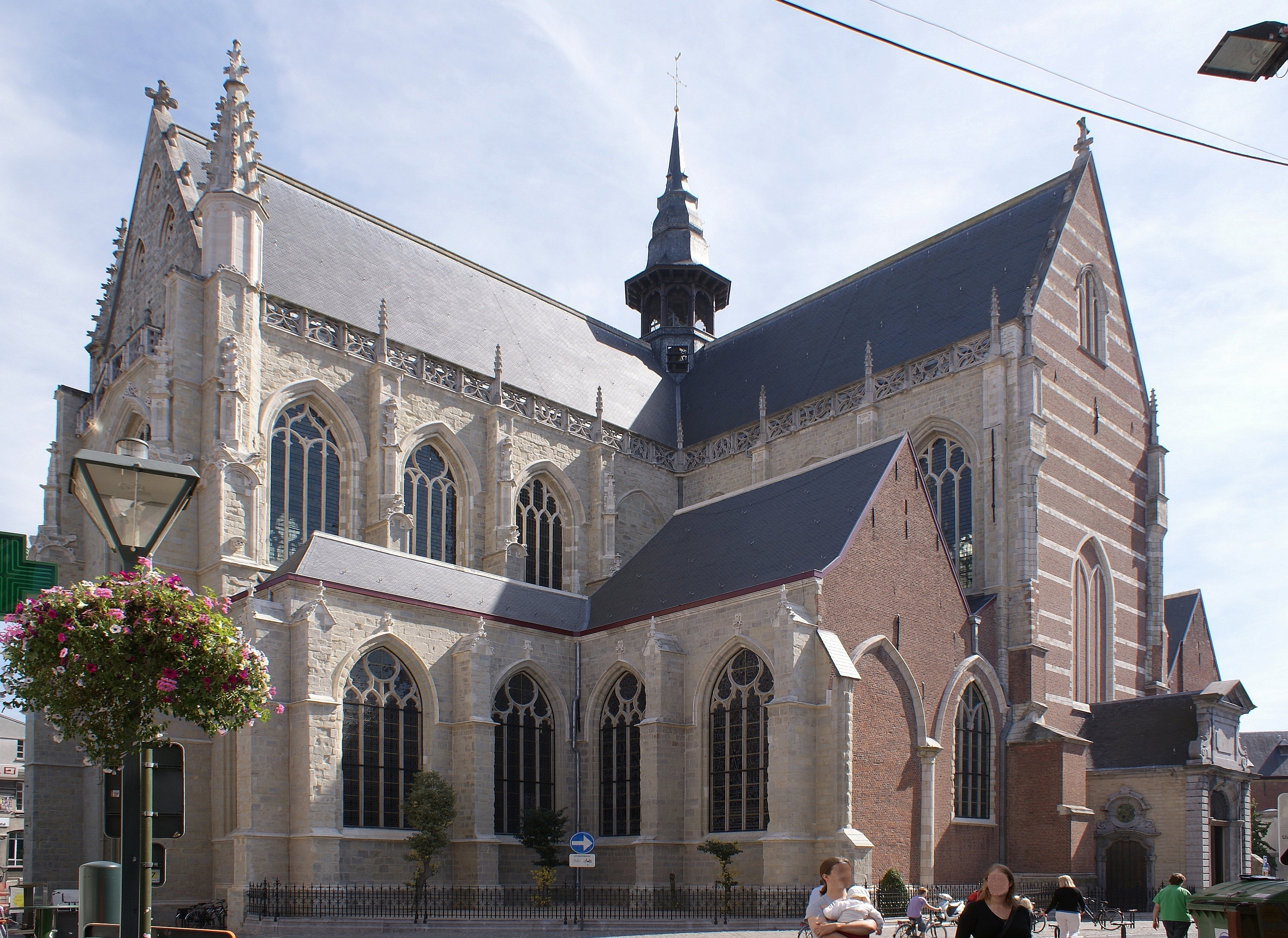
- St Martin's Church in Aalst
- St Martin's Church
- 50°56′16.04″N 4°2′26.66″E
- Location: Aalst
- Country: Belgium
- Denomination: Catholic

History
- Founded: 1480
- Dedication: Saint Martin

Architecture
- Style: Gothic architecture

Administration
- Diocese: Roman Catholic Diocese of Ghent

St Martin's Church or the Church of St. Martin (Dutch: Sint Martinuskerk) is a church located in Aalst, Flanders, Belgium.

== History ==
The Church of St. Martin was established in dedication to Saint Martin. The Gothic-style church was built in 1480.

The altarpiece by Peter Paul Rubens depicting Saint Roch titled Christ Appointing Saint Roch as Patron Saint of Plague Victims is located in the church.

Composed by Erasmus in 1527, the epitaph of Dirk Martens was installed in the church in 1784.

== Gallery ==
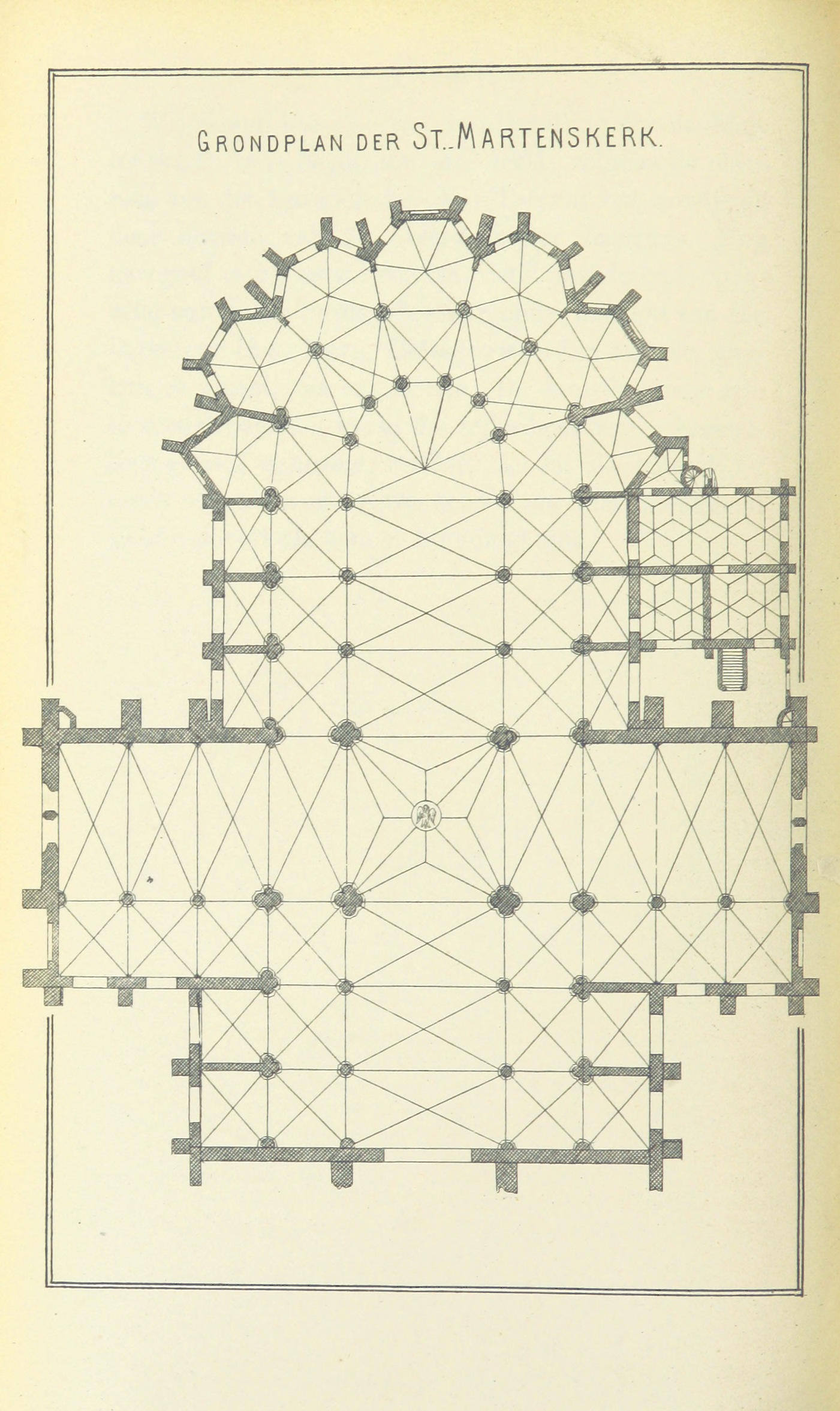
Floor plan of St Martin's Church

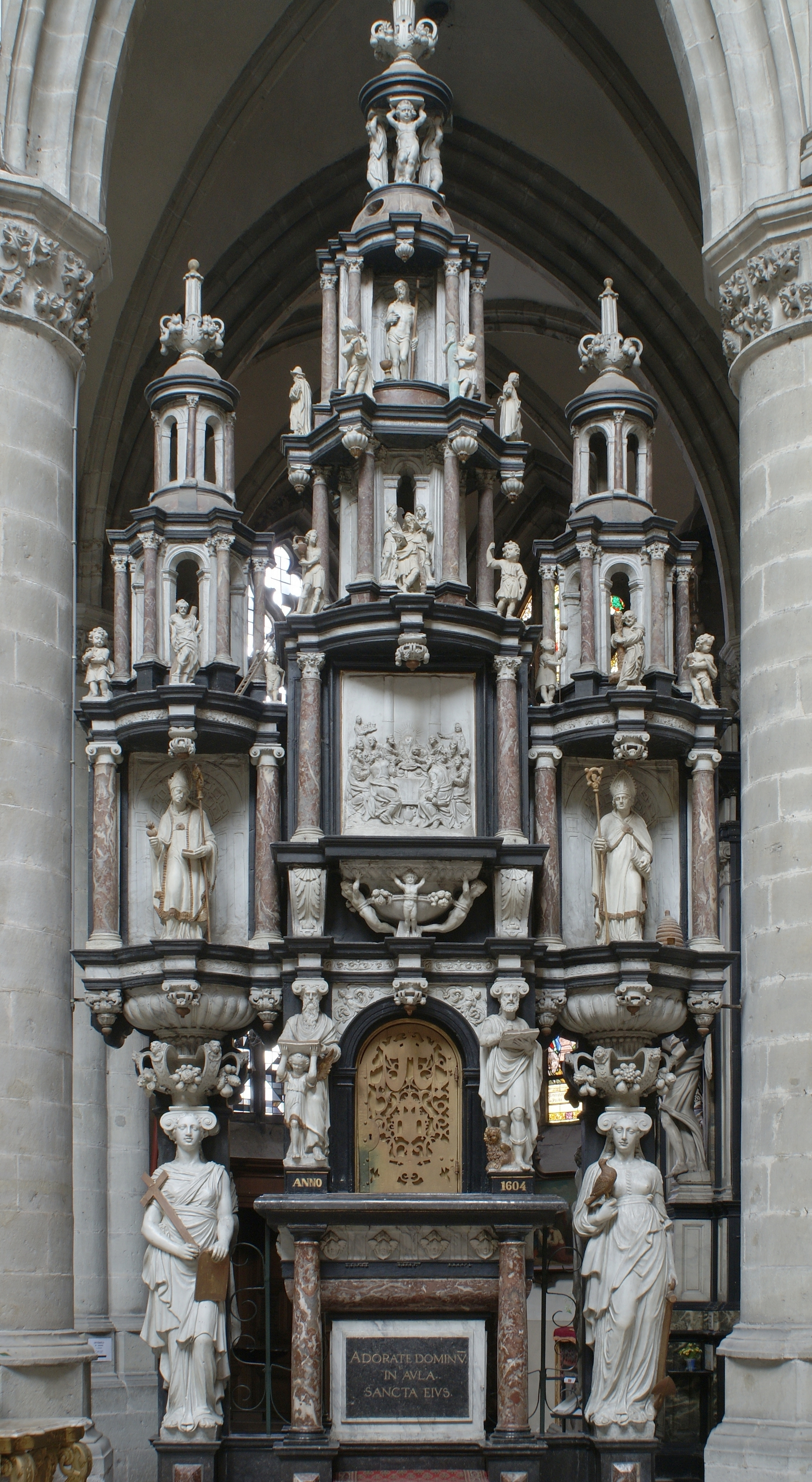
Sacrament Tower
