= Marie Antoinette Being Taken to Her Execution (David) =

1793 ink drawing by Jacques-Louis David

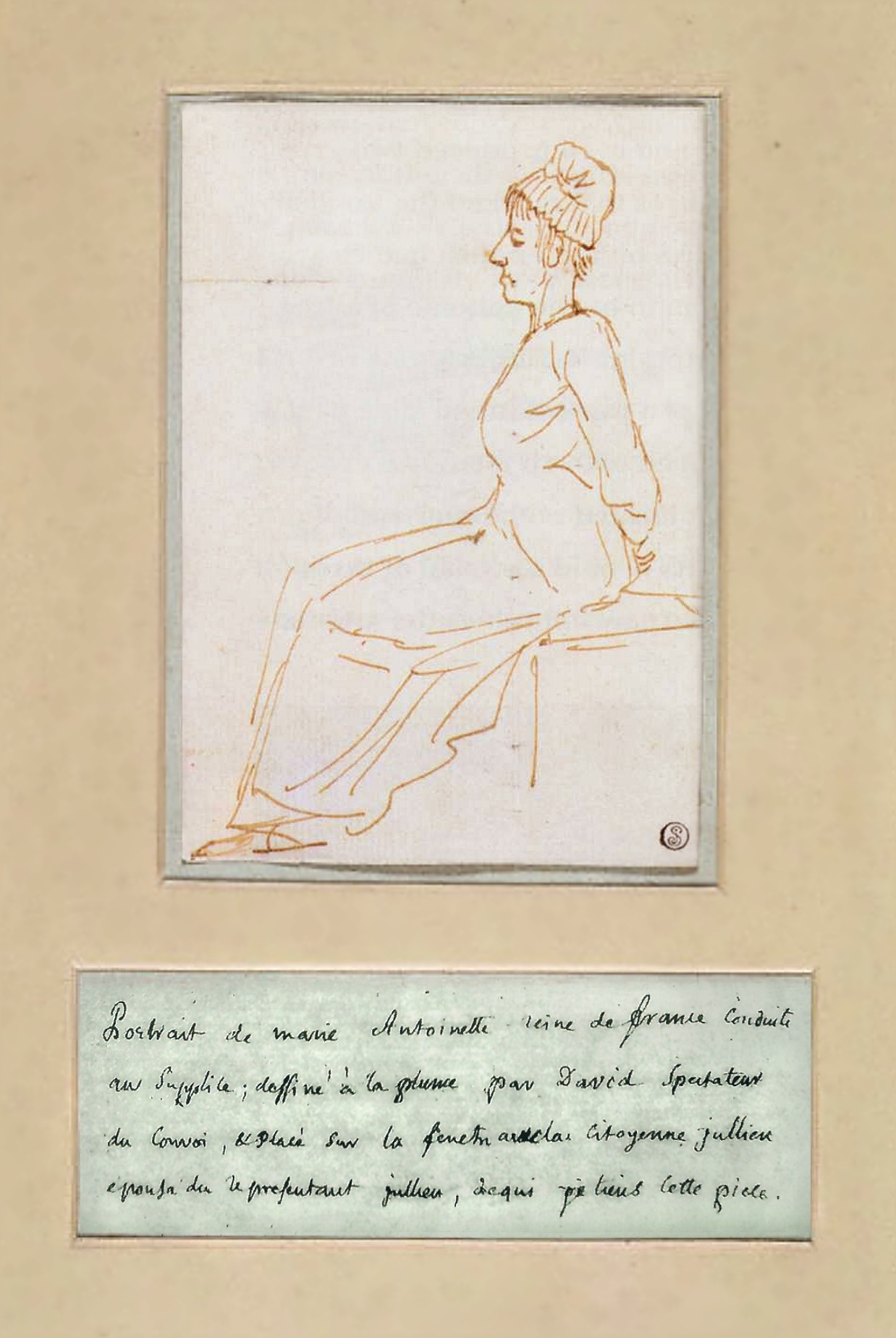
Marie Antoinette Being Taken to Her Execution (1793) by Jacques-Louis David

Marie Antoinette Being Taken to Her Execution is an ink drawing by Jacques-Louis David, produced from the life from a flat window as Marie Antoinette was taken to her execution on 16 October 1793.

Its owner Jean-Louis Giraud-Soulavie added his monogram "S" in a circle at bottom right and below is an inscription by Soulavie.
